This is an incomplete list of Acts of the Parliament of the United Kingdom for the years 1840–1859.  Note that the first parliament of the United Kingdom was held in 1801; parliaments between 1707 and 1800 were either parliaments of Great Britain or of Ireland).  For Acts passed up until 1707 see List of Acts of the Parliament of England and List of Acts of the Parliament of Scotland.  For Acts passed from 1707 to 1800 see List of Acts of the Parliament of Great Britain.  See also the List of Acts of the Parliament of Ireland.

For Acts of the devolved parliaments and assemblies in the United Kingdom, see the List of Acts of the Scottish Parliament, the List of Acts of the Northern Ireland Assembly, and the List of Acts and Measures of the National Assembly for Wales; see also the List of Acts of the Parliament of Northern Ireland.

The number shown after each Act's title is its chapter number. Acts passed before 1963 are cited using this number, preceded by the year(s) of the reign during which the relevant parliamentary session was held; thus the Union with Ireland Act 1800 is cited as "39 & 40 Geo. 3 c. 67", meaning the 67th Act passed during the session that started in the 39th year of the reign of George III and which finished in the 40th year of that reign.  Note that the modern convention is to use Arabic numerals in citations (thus "41 Geo. 3" rather than "41 Geo. III"). Acts of the last session of the Parliament of Great Britain and the first session of the Parliament of the United Kingdom are both cited as "41 Geo. 3".

Some of these Acts have a short title. Some of these Acts have never had a short title.  Some of these Acts have a short title given to them by later Acts, such as by the Short Titles Act 1896.

1840 – 1849

1840 (3 & 4 Vict.)

Public General Acts
 Admiralty Court Act 1840 c 65
 Advances for Public Works Act 1840 c 10
 Appropriation Act 1840 c 112
 Assessed Taxes Act 1840 c 38
 Beerhouse Act 1840 c 61
 British North America Act 1840 c 35
 Caledonian Canal Act 1840 c 41
 Canals (Offences) Act 1840 c 50
 Census (Great Britain) Act 1840 c 99
 Census (Ireland) Act 1840 c 100
 Chimney Sweepers and Chimneys Regulation Act 1840 c 85
 Church Building Act 1840 c 60
 Church Discipline Act 1840 c 86
 Church Temporalities (Ireland) Act 1840 c 101
 Clergy Reserves in Canada Act 1840 c 78
 Costs of Action of Trespass Act 1840 c 24
 Counties and Boroughs (Ireland) Act 1840 c 109
 County of Roscommon Act 1840 c 76
 County Police Act 1840 or the Police Act 1840 c 88
 Court Houses (Ireland) Act 1840 c 102
 Court of Chancery Act 1840 c 94
 Customs Act 1840 c 19
 Customs Act 1840 c 95
 Debtors (Ireland) Act 1840 c 105
 Dublin Justices Act 1840 c 103
 Duties on Glass Act 1840 c 22
 Duties on Soap Act 1840 c 49
 East India Trade Act 1840 c 56
 Ecclesiastical Commissioners Act 1840 c 113
 Ecclesiastical Courts Act 1840 c 93
 Entail Sites Act 1840 c 48
 Evidence Act 1840 c 26
 Evidence (Scotland) Act 1840 c 59
 Exchequer Bills Act 1840 c 12
 Exchequer Bills Act 1840 c 106
 Excise Act 1840 c 17
 Fisheries, Convention with France Act 1840 c 69
 Friendly Societies Act 1840 c 73
 Grammar Schools Act 1840 c 77
 High Court of Admiralty (England) Act 1840 c 66
 Highway Rates Act 1840 c 98
 Holyhead Road Act 1840 c 104. Sometimes called the Holyhead Roads Act 1840.
 Horse Racing Act 1840 c 5
 Importation Act 1840 c 32
 Inclosure Act 1840 c 31
 Indemnity Act 1840 c 16
 Infant Felons Act 1840 c 90
 Insane Prisoners Act 1840 c 54
 Insolvent Debtors, India Act 1840 c 80
 Insolvent Debtors (Ireland) Act 1840 c 14
 Insolvent Debtors (Ireland) Act 1840 c 107
 Isle of Man Harbours Act 1840 c 63
 Joint Stock Companies Act 1840 c 111
 Judgments Act 1840 c 82
 Loan Societies Act 1840 c 110
 Lord Seaton's Annuity Act 1840 c 11
 Manchester Police Act 1840 c 30
 Marine Mutiny Act 1840 c 8
 Marriage Act 1840 c 72
 Masters in Chancery Act 1840 c 34
 Metropolitan Police Courts Act 1840 c 84
 Metropolitan Thoroughfares Act 1840 c 87
 Militia Ballots Suspension Act 1840 c 71
 Militia Pay Act 1840 c 70
 Municipal Corporations (Ireland) Act 1840 c 108
 Mutiny Act 1840 c 6
 Mutiny, East Indies Act 1840 c 37
 National Debt Act 1840 c 75
 Naturalization of Prince Albert Act 1840 c 1
 Naturalization of Prince Albert Act 1840 c 2
 New South Wales and Van Diemen's Land Act 1840 c 62
 Newgate Gaol, Dublin Act 1840 c 53
 Non-parochial Registers Act 1840 c 92
 Oyster Fisheries (Scotland) Act 1840 c 74
 Parliamentary Elections Act 1840 c 47
 Parliamentary Elections Act 1840 c 81
 Parliamentary Papers Act 1840 c 9
 Passenger Ships Act 1840 c 21
 Pilots, etc. Act 1840 c 68
 Poor Law Commission Act 1840 c 42
 Poor Rate Exemption Act 1840 c 89
 Post Office (Duties) Act 1840 c 96
 Prince Albert's Annuity Act 1840 c 3
 Prisons Act 1840 c 25
 Prisons (Ireland) Act 1840 c 44
 Queen Anne's Bounty Act 1840 c 20
 Railway Regulation Act 1840 c 97
 Regency Act 1840 c 52
 Repair of Blenheim Palace Act 1840 c 43
 River Poddle Act 1840 c 58
 Scotch and Irish Paupers Act 1840 c 27
 Scottish Episcopal and other Clergy Act 1840 c 33
 Settled Estates Drainage Act 1840 c 55
 Slave Trade Suppression Act 1840 c 64
 Slave Trade Suppression, Treaty with Venezuela Act 1840 c 67
 Stamps Act 1840 c 79
 Sugar Duties Act 1840 c 23
 Sugar Duties Act 1840 c 57 
 Supply Act 1840 c 4
 Supply Act 1840 c 7
 Textile Manufactures (Ireland) Act 1840 c 91. Sometimes called the Textile Manufacturers (Ireland) Act 1840.
 Timber Ships, British North America Act 1840 c 36 (see also George Palmer (MP for South Essex))
 Tithe Act 1840 c 15
 Tithes (Ireland) Act 1840 c 13
 Tobacco Act 1840 c 18
 Turnpike Acts Continuance Act 1840 c 45
 Turnpike Acts, Ireland, Continuance Act 1840 c 46
 Turnpikes Act 1840 c 39
 Turnpike Tolls Act 1840 c 51
 Usury Act 1840 c 83
 Vaccination Act 1840 c 29
 Watch Rates in Boroughs Act 1840 c 28
 West India Islands Relief Act 1840 c 40

Local acts

| {{|Sheffield and Rotherham Railway Act 1840|local|3|23-03-1840|repealed=y|archived=n|An Act to enable the Sheffield and Rotherham Railway Company to raise a further Sum of Money; and to amend the Act relating to the said Railway.}}
| {{|Lancaster and Preston Junction Railway Act 1840|local|4|23-03-1840|maintained=n|archived=n|An Act to enable the Lancaster and Preston Junction Railway Company to raise a further Sum of Money; and to amend the Act relating to such Railway.}}
| {{|North Union Railway Company Act 1840|local|5|23-03-1840|maintained=n|archived=n|An Act to enable "The North Union Railway Company" to raise a further Sum of Money.}}
| {{|Liverpool East India Warehouse Company Act 1840|local|6|23-03-1840|maintained=n|archived=n|An Act to enable "The Liverpool East India Warehouse Company" to sue and be sued in the Name of the Chairman, Deputy Chairman, or any One of the Directors of the said Company: and for other Purposes relating thereto.}}
| {{|Parish of St. Mary Rotherhithe Act 1840|local|7|23-03-1840|maintained=n|archived=n|An Act to amend an Act passed in the First Year of the Reign of His late Majesty King George the Fourth, entitled An Act for providing additional Burying Ground for the Parish of Saint Mary Rotherhithe in the County of Surrey; and for enabling the Rector of the said Parish to grant Building Leases of the Glebe Lands belonging to the said Rectory; and for other Purposes.}}
| {{|Winchester Cemetery Act 1840|local|8|23-03-1840|repealed=y|archived=n|An Act for establishing a General Cemetery for the Interment of the Dead in the City and Borough of Winchester in the County of Southampton.}}
| {{|Wolverhampton Chapel Act 1840|local|9|23-03-1840|maintained=n|archived=n|An Act to amend and enlarge the Powers and Provisions of an Act passed in the Twenty-eighth Year of the Reign of His Majesty King George the Second, for building a Chapel in the Town of Wolverhampton in the County of Stafford.}}
| {{|Brighton and New Shoreham Small Debts Recovery Act 1840|local|10|23-03-1840|repealed=y|archived=n|An Act for the more easy and speedy Recovery of Small Debts within the Towns and Boroughs of Brighton and New Shoreham, and other Places or Parishes adjacent or near thereto, in the County of Sussex.}}
| {{|West Kennet and Amesbury Turnpike Road (Wiltshire) Act 1840|local|11|23-03-1840|repealed=y|archived=n|An Act for making a Turnpike Road from West Kennet to Amesbury in the County of Wilts, with Branches therefrom.}}
| {{|Edinburgh and Leith Gas Act 1840|local|12|23-03-1840|repealed=y|archived=n|An Act for the better lighting with Gas the City of Edinburgh and Town of Leith, and Places adjacent, and for other Purposes relating thereto.}}
| {{|Edinburgh Gas Light Company Act 1840|local|13|23-03-1840|repealed=y|archived=n|An Act for enabling the Edinburgh Gas Light Company more effectually to light with Gas the Town of Leith, the Vicinity thereof, and other Places in the County of Edinburgh; and for altering and enlarging the Powers of the said Company.}}
| {{|Arbroath and Forfar Railway Act 1840|local|14|03-04-1840|maintained=n|archived=n|An Act to enable the Arbroath and Forfar Railway Company to raise a further Sum of Money, and otherwise to amend and enlarge the Powers and Provisions of the Act relating to the Arbroath and Forfar Railway.}}
| {{|Manchester and Salford Junction Canal Company Act 1840|local|15|03-04-1840|maintained=n|archived=n|An Act to enable the Manchester and Salford  Junction Canal Company to raise a further Sum of Money; and to alter, amend, and enlarge some of the Powers and Provisions of the Act relating to the said Canal.}}
| {{|Cramond Bridge Act 1840|local|16|03-04-1840|repealed=y|archived=n|An Act to continue and amend an Act for erecting a Bridge over the River Almond, which divides the Counties of Edinburgh and Linlithgow.}}
| {{|Edinburgh Customs and Duties Act 1840|local|17|03-04-1840|repealed=y|archived=n|An Act for abolishing certain Petty and Market Customs in the City of Edinburgh, and granting other Duties in lieu thereof.}}
| {{|Bolton Small Debts Recovery Act 1840|local|18|03-04-1840|repealed=y|archived=n|An Act for the more easy and speedy Recovery of Small Debts within the Town of Bolton and other Places in the County of Lancaster.}}
| {{|Thames Plate Glass Company Act 1840|local|19|03-04-1840|maintained=n|archived=n|An Act to enable "The Thames Plate Glass Company" to sue and be sued in the Name of the Chairman or Deputy Chairman, or Secretary, or any One of the Directors for the Time being of the said Company; and for other Purposes.}}
| {{|Protestant Dissenters and General Life and Fire Insurance Company Act 1840|local|20|03-04-1840|maintained=n|archived=n|An Act to enable the Protestant Dissenters and General Life and Fire Insurance Company to sue and be sued in the Name of the Chairman, Deputy Chairman, or any One of the Directors, or of the Secretary of the said Company.}}

| {{|Royal Naval School Act 1840|local|86|19-06-1840|maintained=n|archived=n|An Act for the Establishment and Government of the Institution called "The Royal Naval School".}}

| {{|Bedford and Woburn Road Act 1840|local|100|03-07-1840|repealed=y|archived=n|An Act for repairing, improving, and maintaining the Road from Bedford to Woburn with a Branch therefrom, all in the County of Bedford.}}
| {{|Stirling, Dumbarton, Lanark and Perth Roads Act 1840|local|101|03-07-1840|repealed=y|archived=n|An Act to make, alter, improve, and maintain certain Roads in the Counties of Stirling, Dumbarton, Lanark, and Perth.}}
| {{|Road from Edinburgh to Lanark Act 1840|local|103|03-07-1840|repealed=y|archived=n|An Act to alter and amend certain Acts for making and maintaining a Road from the Limits of the Counties of Edinburgh and Lanark  by Wilsontown into the Burgh of Lanark, with a Branch towards Ravenstruther in the said County of Lanark; and for other Purposes relating thereto.}}
| {{|Ardrossan and Johnston Railway Act 1840|local|104|23-07-1840|archived=n|An Act for separating the Management of the Ardrossan and Johnston Railway from the Management of the Glasgow, Paisley, and Johnston Canal; for incorporating the Proprietors thereof; for doubling and improving the said Railway; and for other Purposes relating thereto.}}
| {{|Birmingham, Bristol and Thames Junction Railway Act 1840|local|105|23-07-1840|archived=n|An Act to amend and enlarge some of the Provisions of the Act relating to the Birmingham, Bristol, and Thames Junction Railway; and to authorize the Company to raise  a further Sum of Money for the Purposes of the said Undertaking.}}
| {{|Dublin and Drogheda Railway Act 1840|local|106|23-07-1840|archived=n|An Act to alter and amend the Acts passed for making a  Railway from Dublin to Drogheda.}}
| {{|Glasgow, Paisley and Greenock Railway Act 1840|local|107|23-07-1840|archived=n|An Act to amend and enlarge the Powers and Provisions of the Act relating to the Glasgow, Paisley, and Greenock Railway, and to make certain new Branch Railways from the Main Line in the Towns of Greenock and Port Glasgow, and to make other Works in connexion with the said Railway.}}
| {{|Edinburgh and Glasgow Railway Act 1840|local|108|23-07-1840|repealed=y|archived=n|An Act to amend the Act relating to the Edinburgh and Glasgow Railway.}}
| {{|Hartlepool Dock and Railway Act 1840|local|109|23-07-1840|archived=n|An ct to enable the Hartlepool Dock and Railway Company to raise a further Sum of Money, for completing their Undertaking; and enlarging the Time for completing the same; and for amending the Acts relating thereto.}}
| {{|Taff Vale Railway Act 1840|local|110|23-07-1840|archived=n|An Act to amend the Acts relating to the Taff Vale Railway.}}

| {{|Herculaneum Docks Act 1840|local|120|04-08-1840|archived=n|An Act for regulating certain intended Docks at Liverpool to be called the Hereulaneum Docks, and exempting Vessels frequenting the same, and their Cargoes, from a Portion of the Tolls and Duties payable to the Trustees of the Liverpool Docks.}}

| {{|Midland Counties Railway Act 1840|local|130|10-08-1840|repealed=y|archived=n|An Act for granting further Powers to the Midland Counties Railway Company.}}
| {{|Port of London Coal and Wines Import Duties Act 1840|local|131|11-08-1840|repealed=y|archived=n|An Act to continue for Four Years, from the Fifth Day of July One thousand eight hundred and fifty-eight, the Duties now levied on Coal and Wines imported into the Port of London.}}
}}

1841

4 & 5 Vict.
 Abolition of Slavery Act 1841 c 18
 Annuity to Lord Keane, etc. Act 1841 c 1
 Application of Highway Rates to Turnpikes Act 1841 c 59
 Appropriation Act 1841 c 53
 Arrest in Personal Actions (Ireland) Act 1841 c 17
 Assessed Taxes Act 1841 c 26
 Bank Notes Act 1841 c 50
 Burning of Houses (Dublin) Act 1841 c 10
 Census Act 1841 c 7
 Controverted Elections Act 1841 c 58
 Conveyance by Release Without Lease Act 1841 c 21
 Copyhold Act 1841 c 35. Sometimes called the Enfranchisement of Copyholds Act 1841.
 County Bridges Act 1841 c 49
 Court Houses (Ireland) Act 1841 c 31
 Court of Chancery Act 1841 c 52
 Dublin, Purchase of Land Act 1841 c 16
 Duties on Rum, etc. Act 1841 c 8
 Ecclesiastical Commissioners Act 1841 c 39
 Entailed Lands, etc. (Scotland) Act 1841 c 24
 Exchequer Bills Act 1841 c 19
 Excise Management Act 1841 c 20 
 Felony Act 1841 c 22 
 Frivolous Suits Act 1841 c 28
 Highway Act 1841 c 51
 Houses of Industry, etc. (Ireland) Act 1841 c 41
 Importation of Arms, etc. (Ireland) Act 1841 c 25
 Indemnity Act 1841 c 11
 Insolvent Debtors (Ireland) Act 1841 c 47
 Loan Societies Act 1841 c 55
 Loan to South Australia Act 1841 c 13
 Madhouses, etc. (Scotland) Act 1841 c 60
 Marine Mutiny Act 1841 c 3
 Metropolitan Improvements Act 1841 c 40
 Militia Ballots Suspension Act 1841 c 23
 Militia Pay Act 1841 c 61
 Monument to Sir Walter Scott Act 1841 c 15
 Municipal Corporations, Poor Rates Act 1841 c 48
 Mutiny Act 1841 c 2
 New South Wales, etc. Government Act 1841 c 44
 Ordnance Survey Act 1841 c 30 
 Parliamentary Elections Act 1841 c 57
 School Sites Act 1841 c 38
 Sewers Act 1841 c 45
 Stamps Act 1841 c 34
 Street from Coventry Street to Long Acre Act 1841 c 12
 Substitution of Punishments for Death Act 1841 c 56
 Sugar Duties Act 1841 c 29
 Supply Act 1841 c 4
 Tithe Compositions (Ireland) Act 1841 c 5
 Tithe Compositions (Ireland) Act 1841 c 37
 Tithes Act 1841 c 36
 Trading Partnerships Act 1841 c 14 
 Tralee Navigation Act 1841 c 46
 Turnpike Acts Continuance Act 1841 c 9
 Turnpike Roads (Ireland) Act 1841 c 6
 Turnpike Tolls Act 1841 c 33
 Usury Act 1841 c 54
 Vaccination Act 1841 c 32
 Western Australia Government Act 1841 c 43
 Winterbourne Parish Act 1841 c 42
 York House and Victoria Park Act 1841 c 27

5 Vict.

| {{|Bishops in Foreign Countries Act 1841|public|6|05-10-1841|maintained=y|archived=n|An Act to amend an Act made in the Twenty-sixth Year of the Reign of His Majesty King George the Third, intituled An Act to empower the Archbishop of Canterbury or the Archbishop of York for the Time being to consecrate to the Office of a Bishop Persons being Subjects or Citizens of Countries out of His Majesty's Dominions.}}
| {{|Care, etc., of Lunatics Act 1841|public|4|05-10-1841|repealed=y|archived=n|An Act to continue for Three Years, and from thence to the End of the then next Session of Parliament, Two Acts relating to the Care and Treatment of Insane Persons in England.}}
| {{|Census Act 1841|public|9|07-10-1841|repealed=y|archived=n|An Act to provide for Payment of the Persons employed in taking Account of the Population in England.}}
| {{|Court of Chancery Act 1841|note1=|public|5|05-10-1841|repealed=y|archived=n|An Act to make further Provisions for the Administration of Justice.}}
| {{|Crown Lands Act 1841|note1=|public|1|05-10-1841|maintained=n|archived=n|An Act to authorize Her Majesty's Commissioners of Woods to grant Building Leases of the Royal Kitchen Garden at Kensington, and to form and improve other Royal Gardens; and to enable the said Commissioners to purchase Lands of Copyhold or Customary Tenure.}}
| {{|Extended Law Continuance Act 1841|public|7|05-10-1841|repealed=y|archived=n|An Act to continue until the Thirty-first Day of July One thousand eight hundred and forty-two such Laws as may expire within a limited Period.}}
| {{|Frogmore House Act 1841|public|2|05-10-1841|repealed=y|archived=n|An Act for annexing the Mansion House, Gardens, and Grounds at Frogmore, Part of the Land Revenue of the Crown, to Windsor Castle.}}
| {{|National Debt Act 1841|public|8|07-10-1841|repealed=y|archived=n|An Act for funding Exchequer Bills, and for making Provision for the Service of the Year One thousand eight hundred and forty-one.}}
| {{|Navy Pay Act 1841|public|3|05-10-1841|repealed=y|archived=n|An Act to alter an Act of the Eleventh Year of King George the Fourth, for amending the Laws relating to the Pay of the Royal Navy, and an Act of the Fifth Year of King William the Fourth, to alter the Provisions of the said Act.}}
| {{|Poor Law Commission Act 1841|public|10|07-10-1841|repealed=y|archived=n|An Act to continue the Poor Law Commission until the Thirty-first Day of July One thousand eight hundred and forty-two.}}
}}

1842 (5 & 6 Vict.)
 Advances for Public Works Act 1842 c 9
 Appropriation Act 1842 c 121
 Appropriation Acts Amendment Act 1842 c 1
 Argentine Treaty Act 1842 c 40
 Australian Colonies, Waste Lands Act 1842 c 36
 Australian Constitutions Act 1842 c 76
 Bankruptcy Act 1842 c 122
 Bishoprics, etc., in West Indies Act 1842 c 4
 Bonded Corn Act 1842 c 92
 Borough Charters Confirmation Act 1842 c 111
 Bribery at Elections Act 1842 c 102
 Canada Loan Guarantee Act 1842 c 118
 Capital Punishment (Ireland) Act 1842 c 28
 Charitable Pawn Offices (Ireland) Act 1842 c 75
 Chelsea Hospital Out-pensioners Act 1842 c 70
 Civil Bill Decrees (Ireland) Act 1842 c 33
 Colonial Duties Act 1842 c 49
 Confirmation of Certain Proceedings Act 1842 c 43
 Controverted Elections Act 1842 c 73
 Copyright Act 1842 c 45
 Copyright of Designs Act 1842 c 100
 Court of Chancery Act 1842 c 103
 Coventry Act 1842 c 110
 Customs Act 1842 c 47
 Customs (Amendment) Act 1842 c 56
 Dean Forest Act 1842 c 65
 Defence Act 1842 c 94
 District Courts and Prisons Act 1842 c 53
 Drainage (Ireland) Act 1842 c 89
 Dublin Baronies Act 1842 c 96
 Dublin Police Act 1842 c 24
 Dublin, Sale of Property Act 1842 c 62
 Duchy of Cornwall Leases, etc. Act 1842 c 2
 Duties on Corn Act 1842 c 14
 Duties on Spirit Mixtures, etc. Act 1842 c 25
 Duties on Spirits, etc. Act 1842 c 15
 Ecclesiastical Houses of Residence Act 1842 c 26
 Ecclesiastical Jurisdiction Act 1842 c 58
 Ecclesiastical Leases Act 1842 c 27
 Ecclesiastical Leasing Act 1842 c 108
 Exchange, Crown and Eton College Act 1842 c 78
 Exchequer Bills Act 1842 c 21
 Exchequer Bills Act 1842 c 66
 Exchequer Bills Act 1842 c 115
 Exchequer Court Act 1842 c 86
 Factors Act 1842 c 39
 Fines and Recoveries Act 1842 c 32
 Fisheries, Convention with France Act 1842 c 63
 Fisheries (Ireland) Act 1842 c 106
 Forest of Dean (Poor Relief) Act 1842 c 48
 Forged Exchequer Bills Act 1842 c 11
 Four Courts Marshalsea (Ireland) Act 1842 c 95
 Game Certificates (Ireland) Act 1842 c 81
 Grand Jury Presentments (Ireland) Act 1842 c 77
 Harwich, etc., Election Act 1842 c 31
 Hyde Park Act 1842 c 19
 Income Tax Act 1842 c 35
 Income Tax (Foreign Dividends) Act 1842 c 80
 Indemnity Act 1842 c 10
 Indian Bishops Act 1842 c 119
 Insolvent Debtors Act 1842 c 116
 Joint Stock Banking Companies Act 1842 c 85
 Justices (Ireland) Act 1842 c 46
 Land Tax Act 1842 c 37
 Licensing Act 1842 c 44
 Limitations of Actions and Costs Act 1842 c 97. Sometimes called the Limitation of Actions and Costs Act 1842.
 Loan Societies Act 1842 c 5
 London Bridge Act 1842 c 64
 Lunacy Act 1842 c 84
 Lunatic Asylums Act 1842 c 87
 Manchester, etc., Police Act 1842 c 117
 Marine Mutiny Act 1842 c 13
 Marriages Confirmation (Ireland) Act 1842 c 113
 Military Savings Banks Act 1842 c 71
 Militia Ballots Suspension Act 1842 c 72
 Militia Pay Act 1842 c 90
 Mines and Collieries Act 1842 c 99
 Municipal Corporations (Ireland) Act 1842 c 104
 Mutiny Act 1842 c 12
 Newfoundland Act 1842 c 120
 Newgate Gaol, Dublin Act 1842 c 6
 Parish Apprentices Act 1842 c 7
 Parish Constables Act 1842 c 109
 Parish Property and Parish Debts Act 1842 c 18
 Passengers in Merchant Ships Act 1842 c 107
 Pentonville Prison Act 1842 c 29
 Perpetuation of Testimony Act 1842 c 69
 Perth Prison Act 1842 c 67
 Poor Law Amendment Act 1842 c 57
 Poor Rates Act 1842 c 50
 Prisons Act 1842 c 98
 Private Lunatic Asylums (Ireland) Act 1842 c 123
 Quarter Sessions Act 1842 c 38
 Queen's Prison Act 1842 c 22
 Railway Passenger Duty Act 1842 c 79
 Railway Regulation Act 1842 c 55
 Reclamation of Lands, etc. (Ireland) Act 1842 c 105
 Roasted Malt for Colouring Beer Act 1842 c 30
 Sees of St. Asaph and Bangor Act 1842 c 112
 Slave Trade Suppression Act 1842 c 42
 Slave Trade Suppression Act 1842 c 59
 Slave Trade Suppression Act 1842 c 91
 Slave Trade Suppression Act 1842 c 101
 Slave Trade Suppression Act 1842 c 114
 Soap Duties Allowances Act 1842 c 16
 South Australia Act 1842 c 61
 Stamp Duties (Ireland) Act 1842 c 82
 St. Briavels Small Debts Court Act 1842 c 83
 Sudbury Disfranchisement Act 1842 c 52
 Sugar Duties Act 1842 c 34
 Supply Act 1842 c 8
 Textile Manufactures (Ireland) Act 1842 c 68
 Timber Ships, America Act 1842 c 17 (see also George Palmer (MP for South Essex))
 Tithe Act 1842 c 54
 Tobacco Act 1842 c 93
 Treason Act 1842 c 51
 Treaty with Hayti Act 1842 c 41
 Turnpike Acts Continuance Act 1842 c 60
 Turnpike Acts (Ireland) Act 1842 c 23
 University of Dublin Registration Act 1842 c 74
 Van Diemen's Land Act 1842 c 3
 Victoria Park Act 1842 c 20
 Western Australia Government Act 1842 c 88

1843 (6 & 7 Vict.)
 Admiralty Lands Act 1843 c 58
 British Settlements Act 1843 c 13 An Act to enable Her Majesty to provide for the Government of her Settlements on the Coast of Africa and in the Falkland Islands
 Annuity, Duchess of Mecklenburgh Strelitz Act 1843 c 25
 Apprehension of Offenders Act 1843 c 34
 Appropriation Act 1843 c 99
 Arms, etc. (Ireland) Act 1843 c 74
 Benefices (Scotland) Act 1843 c 61
 Bridges (Ireland) Act 1843 c 42
 British Subjects in China Act 1843 c 80
 Charitable Loan Societies (Ireland) Act 1843 c 91
 Chelsea Hospital Act 1843 c 31
 Chelsea Hospital Out-pensioners Act 1843 c 95
 Church at Limerick Act 1843 c 88
 Coal Vendors Act 1843 c 2
 (Colonies) Evidence Act 1843 c 22
 Controverted Elections Act 1843 c 47
 Copyhold Act 1843 c 23
 Copyright of Designs Act 1843 c 65
 Coroners Act 1843 c 12
 Coroners Act 1843 c 83
 Court of Queen's Bench Act 1843 c. 20
 Customs Act 1843 c 84
 Duties on Spirits Act 1843 c 49
 Duties on Wheat, etc. Act 1843 c 29
 Ecclesiastical Jurisdiction Act 1843 c 60
 Evidence Act 1843 c 85
 Evidence by Commission Act 1843 c 82
 Exchequer Bills Act 1843 c 17
 Exchequer Court (Ireland) Act 1843 c 55
 Exchequer Court (Ireland) Act 1843 c 78
 Extradition Act 1843 c 75
 Extradition Act 1843 c 76
 Fines, etc. (Ireland) Act 1843 c 56
 Foreign Jurisdiction Act 1843 c 94
 Forged Exchequer Bills Act 1843 c 1
 Grand Juries (Ireland) Act 1843 c 32
 Grand Jury Presentments (Ireland) Act 1843 c 71
 Highway Rates Act 1843 c 59
 Hosiery Act 1843 c 40
 House of Lords Oath Act 1843 c 6
 Incapacitated Bishops Act 1843 c 62
 Indemnity Act 1843 c 9
 Judicial Committee Act 1843 c 38
 Justices (Ireland) Act 1843 c 8
 Keeper of Holyrood Park, etc. Act 1843 c 64
 Land Tax, Assessed Tax, and Income Tax Act 1843 c 24
 Libel Act 1843 c 96
 Limitation of Actions Act 1843 c 54. Sometimes called the Limitation of Action Act 1843.
 Loan Societies Act 1843 c 41
 London Hackney Carriages Act 1843 c 86
 Marine Mutiny Act 1843 c 4
 Marriages Confirmation (Ireland) Act 1843 c 39
 Militia Ballots Suspension Act 1843 c 43
 Militia Pay Act 1843 c 70
 Millbank Prison Act 1843 c 26
 Municipal Corporations (England) Act 1843 c 89
 Municipal Corporations (Ireland) Act 1843 c 93
 Mutiny Act 1843 c 3
 New Parishes Act 1843 c 37
 Norfolk Island Act 1843 c 35
 Parliamentary Elections (Ireland) Act 1843 c 28
 Parliamentary Voters Registration Act 1843 c 18
 Poor Rates Act 1843 c 48
 Poor Relief (Ireland) Act 1843 c 92
 Pound-breach Act 1843 c 30
 Public Notaries Act 1843 c 90
 Public Works (Ireland) Act 1843 c 44
 Punishment of Death Act 1843 c 10
 Relief of Certain Bishops (Ireland) Act 1843 c 57
 Salmon Fisheries Act 1843 c 33
 Scientific Societies Act 1843 c 36
 Sea Fisheries Act 1843 c 79
 Session of the Peace, Dublin Act 1843 c 81
 Slave Trade Act 1843 c 46
 Slave Trade Act 1843 c 98
 Slave Trade Treaties Act 1843 c 50
 Slave Trade Treaties Act 1843 c 51
 Slave Trade Treaties Act 1843 c 52
 Slave Trade Treaties Act 1843 c 53
 Slave Trade Treaties with Bolivia, Texas, Uruguay Act 1843 c 14
 Slave Trade Treaties with Bolivia, Texas, Uruguay Act 1843 c 15
 Slave Trade Treaties with Bolivia, Texas, Uruguay Act 1843 c 16
 Solicitors Act 1843 c 73
 Stamps Act 1843 c 72
 Sudbury Bribery Commission Act 1843 c 97
 Sudbury Disfranchisement Act 1843 c 11
 Sugar Duties Act 1843 c 27
 Supply Act 1843 c 5
 Supply Act 1843 c 87
 Thatched House Court and Little St. James's Street, Westminster Act 1843 c 19
 Theatres Act 1843 c 68
 Transportation Act 1843 c 7
 Turnpike Acts 1843 c 69
 Turnpike Acts (Ireland) Act 1843 c 21
 Usury Act 1843 c 45
 Warrants of Attorney Act 1843 c 66
 Welsh Cathedrals Act 1843 c 77
 West Indies Relief Act 1843 c 63
 Writs of Mandamus Act 1843 c 67

1844 (7 & 8 Vict.)
 Actions for Gaming Act 1844 c 3
 Actions for Gaming Act 1844 c 58
 Admiralty Offences Act 1844 c 2
 Aliens Act 1844 c 66
 Appropriation Act 1844 c 104
 Arbitrations Act 1844 c 93
 Arrangements Between Debtors and Creditors Act 1844 c 70
 Art Unions Indemnity Act 1844 c 109
 Assaults (Ireland) Act 1844 c 23
 Assessed Taxes, Property Tax, and Duty on Pensions and Offices of Profit Act 1844 c 46
 Australian Constitutions Act 1844 c 74
 Bank Charter Act 1844 c 32
 Burning of Farm Buildings Act 1844 c 62
 Butter and Cheese Trade Act 1844 c 48
 Charitable Donations and Bequests (Ireland) Act 1844 c 97
 Charitable Loan Societies (Ireland) Act 1844 c 38
 Church Building (Banns and Marriages) Act 1844 c 56
 Clerk of the Crown in Chancery Act 1844 c 77
 Commissioners of Woods (Audit) Act 1844 c 89
 Common Law Offices (Ireland) Act 1844 c 107
 Controverted Elections Act 1844 c 103
 Copyhold Act 1844 c 55. Sometimes called the Copyhold Lands Act 1844.
 Coroners Act 1844 c 92
 Counties (Detached Parts) Act 1844 c 61
 County Dublin Grand Jury Act 1844 c 106
 County Rates Act 1844 c. 33
 Courts-martial in India Act 1844 c 18
 Customs Act 1844 c 16
 Customs Act 1844 c 43
 Customs Act 1844 c 73
 Defranchisement of Sudbury Act 1844 c 53
 District Courts and Prisons Act 1844 c 50
 Duchy of Cornwall Act 1844 c 65
 Duchy of Cornwall (No. 2) Act 1844 c 105
 Ecclesiastical Courts Act 1844 c 68
 Edinburgh Debt Act 1844 c 20
 Exchequer Bills Act 1844 c 14
 Execution Act 1844 c 96
 Factories Act 1844 c 15
 Fisheries (Ireland) Act 1844 c 108
 Forest of Dean Act 1844 c 13
 Forestalling, Regrating, etc. Act 1844 c 24
 Gaming Transactions Act 1844 c 7
 Gold and Silver Wares Act 1844 c 22
 Grand Canal Branches (Ireland) Act 1844 c 98
 Importation Act 1844 c 100
 Improvements, Metropolis Act 1844 c 1
 Income Tax Act 1844 c 39
 Indemnity Act 1844 c 10
 Inferior Courts Act 1844 c 19
 International Copyright Act 1844 c 12
 Joint Stock Banks Act 1844 c 113
 Joint Stock Companies Act 1844 c 110
 Joint Stock Companies Winding-Up Act 1844 c 111
 Judgments (Ireland) Act 1844 c 90
 Judicial Committee Act 1844 c 69
 Knackers Act 1844 c 87
 Land Tax Commissions Act 1844 c 79
 Lecturers and Parish Clerks Act 1844 c 59
 Linen Manufactures (Ireland) Act 1844 c 47
 Loan Societies Act 1844 c 54
 Marine Mutiny Act 1844 c 11
 Marriages (Ireland) Act 1844 c 81
 Merchant Seamen Act 1844 c 112
 Metropolitan Buildings Act 1844 c 84
 Middlesex Sessions Act 1844 c 71
 Militia Ballots Suspension Act 1844 c 35
 Militia Pay Act 1844 c 75
 Mutiny Act 1844 c 9
 National Debt Act 1844 c 4
 National Debt Act 1844 c 5
 National Debt Act 1844 c 64
 National Debt Act 1844 c 80
 New Parishes Act 1844 c 94
 New Parishes (Scotland) Act 1844 c 44
 New South Wales Act 1844 c 72
 Night Poaching Act 1844 c 29
 Nonconformists Chapels Act 1844 c 45
 Parish Constables Act 1844 c 52
 Party Processions (Ireland) Act 1844 c 63
 Piccadilly Act 1844 c 88
 Poor Law Amendment Act 1844 c 101
 Poor Rates Act 1844 c 40
 Post Horse Licence Duties (Ireland) Act 1844 c 67
 Post Office (Duties) Act 1844 c 49
 Prisons (Scotland) Act 1844 c 34
 Railway Regulation Act 1844 c 85
 Recovery of Advowsons in Ireland Act 1844 c 27
 Roman Catholics Act 1844 c 102
 Salmon Fisheries (Scotland) Act 1844 c 95
 Savings Bank Act 1844 c 83
 School Sites Act 1844 c 37
 Scotch and Irish Paupers Removal Act 1844 c 42
 Slave Trade Act 1844 c 26
 Soap Duties Allowances Act 1844 c 51
 Solicitors (Clerks) Act 1844 c 86
 South Wales Turnpike Trusts Act 1844 c 91. Sometimes called the Turnpikes, South Wales Act 1844.
 Spirits (Ireland) Act 1844 c 82
 Stamps Act 1844 c 21
 Stipendiary Magistrate for Manchester Act 1844 c 30
 Sugar Duties Act 1844 c 28
 Supply Act 1844 c 6
 Teachers of Schools (Ireland) Act 1844 c 8
 Trafalgar Square Act 1844 c 60
 Tralee Navigation and Harbour Act 1844 c 99
 Transfer of Property Act 1844 c 76
 Turnpike Acts, Great Britain Act 1844 c 41
 Turnpike Acts (Ireland) Act 1844 c 36
 Unlawful Oaths (Ireland) Act 1844 c 78
 Vinegar Act 1844 c 25
 Warehousing of Foreign Goods, Manchester Act 1844 c 31
 West Indian Islands Relief Act 1844 c 17
 Western Australia Government Act 1844 c 57

1845 (8 & 9 Vict.)

Public General Acts
 Abolition of Offices in Courts of Law Act 1845 c 78
 Appropriation Act 1845 c 130
 Art Unions Indemnity Act 1845 c 57
 Assessed Taxes Act 1845 c 36
 Auctioneers Act 1845 c 15
 Bail in Error Act 1845 c 68
 Bank Notes (Scotland) Act 1845 c 38
 Bankers (Ireland) Act 1845 c 37
 Bankruptcy Act 1845 c 48
 Bastardy Act 1845 c 10
 Bonded Corn Act 1845 c 103
 Borough and Watch Rates Act 1845 c 110
 Canal Carriers Act 1845 c 42
 Canal Tolls Act 1845 c 28
 Central Criminal Lunatic Asylum (Ireland) Act 1845 c 107
 Certain Export Duties Repeal Act 1845 c 7
 Chancery Taxing Master (Ireland) Act 1845 c 115
 Church Building Act 1845 c 70
 Coal Duty, London Act 1845 c 101
 Commissioners of Customs Act 1845 c 85
 Companies Clauses Consolidation Act 1845 c 16
 Companies Clauses Consolidation (Scotland) Act 1845 c 17
 Constables near Public Works (Scotland) Act 1845 c 3
 Conveyance of Real Property Act 1845 c 119
 Counties of Drogheda and Meath Act 1845 c 121
 County Rates Act 1845 c 111
 Court of Chancery Act 1845 c 105
 Crown Lands Act 1845 c 99
 Customs Act 1845 c 12
 Customs Act 1845 c 84
 Customs Act 1845 c 86
 Customs Act 1845 c 92
 Darby Court, Westminster Act 1845 c 104
 Dog Stealing Act 1845 c 47
 Drainage (Ireland) Act 1845 c 69
 Duties of Customs Act 1845 c 90
 Duties on Spirits Act 1845 c 65
 Duties on Sugar Act 1845 c 13
 Ecclesiastical Patronage (Ireland) Act 1845 c 51
 Evidence Act 1845 c 113
 Exchequer Bills Act 1845 c 23
 Exchequer Bills Act 1845 c 129
 Extradition Act 1845 c 120
 Fisher Lane, Greenwich Act 1845 c 22
 Fisheries (Ireland) Act 1845 c 108
 Gaming Act 1845 c 109
 Gaol Fees Abolition Act 1845 c 114
 Geological Survey Act 1845 c 63
 Glass Duties Repeal Act 1845 c 6
 Grand Jury (Dublin) Act 1845 c 81. Sometimes called the Dublin Grand Jury Act 1845.
 Heritable Securities (Scotland) Act 1845 c 31
 Highway Act 1845 c 71
 Highway Rates Act 1845 c 59
 Highways, etc. (Scotland) Act 1845 c 41
 Hosiery Act 1845 c 77
 Inclosure Act 1845 c 118
 Income Tax Act 1845 c 4
 Indemnity Act 1845 c 24
 Infeftment Act 1845 c 35
 Isle of Man Trade Act 1845 c 94
 Joint Stock Companies (Ireland) Act 1845 c 98
 Judicial Committee Act 1845 c 30
 Juries (Ireland) Act 1845 c 67
 Land Drainage Act 1845 c 56
 Lands Clauses Consolidation Act 1845 c 18
 Lands Clauses Consolidation (Scotland) Act 1845 c 19
 Leases Act 1845 c 124
 Libel Act 1845 c 75
 Loan Societies Act 1845 c 60
 Lotteries Act 1845 c 74
 Lunacy Act 1845 c 100
 Lunacy Act 1845 c 126
 Manchester Stipendiary Magistrate Act 1845 c 21
 Marine Mutiny Act 1845 c 9
 Maynooth College Act 1845 c 25
 Merchant Seaman Act 1845 c 116
 Military Savings Bank Act 1845 c 27
 Militia Ballots Suspension Act 1845 c 58
 Militia Pay Act 1845 c 82
 Mortgage of County Rates, Middlesex Act 1845 c 32
 Municipal Offices Act 1845 c 52
 Museums Act 1845 c 43
 Mutiny Act 1845 c 8
 National Debt Act 1845 c 62
 Naval Medical Supplemental Fund Society Act 1845 c 123
 Parish Schoolmasters (Scotland) Act 1845 c 40
 Parishes (Ireland) Act 1845 c 54
 Passenger Ships Act 1845 c 14
 Poor Law (Scotland) Act 1845 c 83
 Poor Rates Act 1845 c 79
 Poor Removal Act 1845 c 117
 Prevention of Smuggling Act 1845 c 87
 Print Works Act 1845 c 29
 Protection of Works of Art, etc. Act 1845 c 44
 Public Funds Act 1845 c 97
 Quarter Sessions (Ireland) Act 1845 c 80
 Queen's Colleges (Ireland) Act 1845 c 66
 Railway (Sales and Leases) Act 1845 c 96
 Railway Clauses Consolidation Act 1845 c 20
 Railway Clauses Consolidation (Scotland) Act 1845 c 33
 Real Property Act 1845 c 106
 Registering of British Vessels Act 1845 c 89
 Revenue Act 1845 c 76
 Rothwell Gaol Act 1845 c 72
 Satisfied Terms Act 1845 c 112
 Seal Office in Courts of Queen's Bench and Common Pleas Act 1845 c 34
 Sheriffs, Wales Act 1845 c 11
 Shipping, etc. Act 1845 c 88
 Shrewsbury and Holyhead Road Act 1845 c 73
 Silk Weavers Act 1845 c 128
 Sir H. Pottinger's Annuity Act 1845 c 49
 Slave Trade, Brazil Act 1845 c 122
 Small Debts Act 1845 c 127
 Special Constables (Ireland) Act 1845 c 46
 Spirits (Ireland) Act 1845 c 64
 Stamps Act 1845 c 2
 Sugar Duties Act 1845 c 5
 Supply Act 1845 c 1
 Timber Ships Act 1845 c 45 (see also George Palmer (MP for South Essex))
 Trade of British Possessions Act 1845 c 93
 Trout (Scotland) Act 1845 c 26
 Turnpike Acts Continuance Act 1845 c 53
 Turnpike Acts (Ireland) Act 1845 c 125
 Turnpike Trusts., South Wales Act 1845 c 61
 Unlawful Oaths (Ireland) Act 1845 c 55
 Usury Act 1845 c 102
 Wages Arrestment (Scotland) Act 1845 c 39
 Warehousing of Goods Act 1845 c 91
 Waste Lands, Van Diemen's Land Act 1845 c 95
 West India Island Relief Act 1845 c 50

Local Acts
 Royal Naval School Act 1845 c. xxii

1846 (9 & 10 Vict.)

Public General Acts

| {{|Annuity Lord Hardinge Act 1846|public|31|27-07-1846|repealed=y|archived=n|An act to settle an Annuity on Viscount Hardinge, and the Two next surviving Heirs Male of the Body of the said Viscount Hardinge to whom the Title of Viscount shall descend, in consideration of his great and brilliant Services.}}
}}

 Appropriation Act 1846 c 116
 Art Unions Act 1846 c 48
 Assessed Taxes and Income Tax Act 1846 c 56
 Baths and Washhouses Act 1846 c 74
 Baths and Washhouses (Ireland) Act 1846 c 87
 Battersea Bridge and Embankment, etc. Act 1846 c 39
 Battersea Park Act 1846 c 38
 Burgh Trading Act 1846 c 17
 Central Criminal Court Act 1846 c 24
 Church Building (Burial Service in Chapels) Act 1846 c 68
 Church Patronage Act 1846 c 88
 Citations (Scotland) Act 1846 c 67
 Coalwhippers, Port of London Act 1846 c 36
 Constabulary (Ireland) Act 1846 c 97
 Copyhold Commission Act 1846 c 53
 Coroners (Ireland) Act 1846 c 37
 County Courts Act 1846 c 95. Sometimes called the County Courts (England) Act 1846.
 County Works (Ireland) Act 1846 c 2
 County Works (Ireland) Act 1846 c 71
 County Works (Ireland) Act 1846 c 78
 Crown Appointments, Colonies Act 1846 c 91
 Customs Act 1846 c 23
 Customs Act 1846 c 58
 Customs Act 1846 c 94
 Customs Act 1846 c 102
 Deodands Act 1846 c 62
 Drainage (Ireland) Act 1846 c 4
 Ejectment and Distress (Ireland) Act 1846 c 111
 Election of Members for Cheshire Act 1846 c 44
 Exchequer Bills Act 1846 c 15
 Exclusive Trading (Ireland) Act 1846 c 76
 Fatal Accidents Act 1846 c 93
 Fever (Ireland) Act 1846 c 6
 Fisheries (Ireland) Act 1846 c 3
 Fisheries (Ireland) Act 1846 c 114
 Friendly Societies Act 1846 c 27
 Government of New Zealand Act 1846 c 103
 Grand Jury Cess Act 1846 c. 60
 Highway Rates Act 1846 c 49
 House of Commons Offices Act 1846 c 77
 Importation Act 1846 c 22 ("Corn Laws")
 Inclosure Act 1846 c 70
 Inclosures Act 1846 c 16
 Inclosures Act 1846 c 117
 Income Tax Act 1846 c 81
 Indemnity Act 1846 c 13
 Insolvent Debtors, India Act 1846 c 14
 Interpleader (Ireland) Act 1846 c 64
 Joint Stock Banks (Scotland and Ireland) Act 1846 c 75
 Leases (Ireland) Act 1846 c 112
 Loan Societies Act 1846 c 52
 Loans for Public Works (Ireland) Act 1846 c 85
 Loans for Public Works (Ireland) Act 1846 c 108
 Local Acts, Preliminary Inquiries Act 1846 c 106
 Lunatic Asylums, etc. Act 1846 c 84
 Lunatic Asylums (Ireland) Act 1846 c 79
 Lunatic Asylums (Ireland) Act 1846 c 115
 Malicious Injuries by Fire, etc. Act 1846 c 25
 Marine Mutiny Act 1846 c 12
 Marriages (Ireland) Act 1846 c 72
 Metropolitan Buildings Act 1846 c 5
 Militia Ballots Suspension Act 1846 c 43
 Militia Pay Act 1846 c 55
 Mutiny Act 1846 c 11
 National Debt Act 1846 c 8
 Naval and Military Accounts Act 1846 c 92
 Naval Medical Supplemental Fund Society Act 1846 c 69
 New Street from Spitalfields to Shoreditch Act 1846 c 34
 New Zealand Company Act 1846 c 42
 New Zealand Company Act 1846 c 82
 Newfoundland Constitution Act 1846 c 45
 Nuisances Removal, etc. Act 1846 c 96
 Ordnance Survey Act 1846 c 46
 Out-pensioners Payment Act 1846 c 10
 Out-pensioners Services Act 1846 c 9
 Parliamentary Deposits Act 1846 c 20
 Parliamentary Elections Act 1846 c 30
 Parliamentary Elections (Ireland) Act 1846 c 19
 Pawnbrokers Act 1846 c 98
 Poor Employment (Ireland) Act 1846 c 107
 Poor Rates Act 1846 c 50
 Poor Removal Act 1846 c 66
 Practitioners in Common Pleas Act 1846 c 54
 Print Works Act 1846 c 18
 Prisons (Ireland) Act 1846 c 61
 Prohibition and Mandamus (Ireland) Act 1846 c 113
 Public Money Drainage Act 1846 c 101
 Public Works Advances (Ireland) Act 1846 c 109
 Public Works (Ireland) (No. 1) Act 1846 c 1
 Public Works (Ireland) (No. 2) Act 1846 c 86
 Public Works Loans Act 1846 c 80
 Public Works Loans Act 1846 c 83
 Railway Companies Dissolution Act 1846 c 28
 Railway Regulation (Gauge) Act 1846 c 57. Sometimes called the Regulating the Gauge of Railways Act 1846.
 Railways Commissioners Act 1846 c 105
 Rateable Property (Ireland) Act 1846 c 110
 Religious Disabilities Act 1846 c 59
 Ropeworks Act 1846 c 40
 Seditious Meeting Act 1846 c 33
 Steam Navigation Act 1846 c 100
 Still Licences Act 1846 c 90
 Stipendiary Magistrate, Staffordshire Act 1846 c 65
 Sugar Duties Act 1846 c 29
 Sugar Duties Act 1846 c 41
 Sugar Duties Act 1846 c 63
 Supply Act 1846 c 7
 Supply Act 1846 c 47
 Tithe Act 1846 c 73
 Transportation Act 1846 c 26
 Turnpike Acts, Great Britain Act 1846 c 51
 Turnpike Roads (Ireland) Act 1846 c 89
 Viscount Hardinge's Annuity Act 1846 c 21
 Waste Lands, Australia Act 1846 c 104
 Western Australia Government Act 1846 c 35
 Wreck and Salvage Act 1846 c 99

Local Acts
 North Staffordshire Railway (Churnet Valley) Act 1846 c. lxxxvi
 Black Sluice Drainage Act 1846 c. ccxcviii

1847 (10 & 11 Vict.)

Public general acts
 Advances for Railways (Ireland) Act 1847 c 73
 Aliens Act 1847 c 83
 Appropriation Act 1847 c 107
 Bankruptcy, etc. Act 1847 c 102
 Baths and Washhouses Act 1847 c 61
 Burgh Police, etc. (Scotland) Act 1847 c 39
 Canada Civil List Act 1847 c 71
 Canal (Carriers) Act 1847 c 94
 Cemeteries Clauses Act 1847 c 65
 Chelsea and Greenwich Out-pensioners Act 1847 c 54
 Chelsea Pensions (Abolition of Poundage) Act 1847 c 4
 Colonial Copyright Act 1847 c 95
 Commissioners Clauses Act 1847 c 16
 Copyhold Commission Act 1847 c 101
 Corn Duties Act 1847 c 1
 County Buildings Act 1847 c 28
 Crown Charters (Scotland) Act 1847 c 51
 Customs Act 1847 c 23
 Distillation of Spirits from Sugar Act 1847 c 6
 Drainage, etc. (Ireland) Act 1847 c 106
 Drainage (Ireland) Act 1847 c 79
 Duties on Buckwheat, etc. Act 1847 c 3
 Duties on Corn, etc. Act 1847 c 64
 Ecclesiastical Commissioners Act 1847 c 108
 Ecclesiastical Jurisdiction Act 1847 c 98
 Employment of Poor Act 1847 c 87
 Employment of Poor, etc. (Ireland) Act 1847 c 80
 Exchequer Bills Act 1847 c 19
 Factories Act 1847 c 29
 Fever (Ireland) Act 1847 c 22
 Gasworks Clauses Act 1847 c 15
 General Register House, Edinburgh Act 1847 c 20
 Government of Newfoundland Act 1847 c 44
 Harbours, Docks, and Piers Clauses Act 1847 c 27
 Heritable Securities (Scotland) Act 1847 c 50
 Highway Rates Act 1847 c 93
 Holyhead Harbour Act 1847 c 76
 House of Commons Costs Taxation Act 1847 c 69
 Importation Act 1847 c 2
 Importation Act 1847 c 86
 Inclosure Act 1847 c 111
 Inclosures Act 1847 c 25
 Indemnity Act 1847 c 18
 Irish Constabulary Act 1847 c 100
 Joint Stock Companies Act 1847 c 78
 Juvenile Offenders Act 1847 c 82
 Land Drainage Act 1847 c 38
 Land Drainage (Scotland) Act 1847 c 113
 Land for Prisons (Ireland) Act 1847 c 26
 Landed Property Improvement (Ireland) Act 1847 c 32
 Leith Harbour and Docks Act 1847 c 114
 Loan Societies Act 1847 c 53
 London Bridge Approaches Fund Act 1847 c 115
 Lunatic Asylums Act 1847 c 43
 Lunatic Asylum (Ireland) Act 1847 c 40
 Manufactures Improvement Fund (Scotland) Act 1847 c 91
 Marine Mutiny Act 1847 c 13
 Markets and Fairs Clauses Act 1847 c 14
 Marriages of Jews and Quakers Act 1847 c 58
 Masters in Chancery Act 1847 c 60
 Masters in Chancery Act 1847 c 97
 Militia Ballots Suspension Act 1847 c 68
 Militia Pay Act 1847 c 88
 Mussel Fisheries (Scotland) Act 1847 c 92
 Mutiny Act 1847 c 12
 National Debt Act 1847 c 9
 Naval Deserters Act 1847 c 62
 Naval Mutiny Act 1847 c 59
 Naval Service of Boys Act 1847 c 30
 New Zealand Act 1847 c 112
 Parliamentary Elections (Soldiers) Act 1847 c 21
 Passenger Act 1847 c 103
 Piers and Harbours (Ireland) Act 1847 c 75
 Polling at Elections (Ireland) Act 1847 c 81
 Poor Law Board Act 1847 c 109
 Poor Rates Act 1847 c 77
 Poor Relief (Ireland) Act 1847 c 7
 Poor Relief (Ireland) Act 1847 c 10
 Poor Relief (Ireland) Act 1847 c 31
 Poor Relief (Ireland) Act 1847 c 55
 Poor Relief (Ireland) Act 1847 c 99
 Poor Relief (Ireland) (No. 2) Act 1847 c 90
 Poor Removal Act 1847 c 33
 Poor Removal Act 1847 c 110
 Port Natal Act 1847 c 56
 Portland Breakwater Act 1847 c 24
 Post Office (Duties) Act 1847 c 85
 Print Works Act 1847 c 70
 Prisoners Removal (Ireland) Act 1847 c 45
 Public Money Drainage Act 1847 c 11
 Railway Passenger Duty Act 1847 c 42
 Representative Peers (Scotland) Act 1847 c 52
 Royal Marines Act 1847 c 63
 Service of Heirs (Scotland) Act 1847 c 47
 Settled Land (Ireland) Act 1847 c 46
 Shannon Navigation Act 1847 c 74
 Soap Duties Allowances Act 1847 c 41
 South Wales Turnpike Roads Act 1847 c 72
 Subscriptions to Loan Act 1847 c 36
 Sugar in Brewing Act 1847 c 5
 Supply Act 1847 c 8
 Threatening Letters, etc. Act 1847 c 66
 Time of Service in the Army Act 1847 c 37
 Tithe Act 1847 c 104
 Town Police Clauses Act 1847 c 89 pdf
 Towns Improvement Clauses Act 1847 c 34
 Transference of Lands (Scotland) Act 1847 c 48
 Transference of Lands (Scotland) Act 1847 c 49
 Transportation Act 1847 c 67
 Trustees Relief Act 1847 c 96
 Turnpike Acts, Great Britain Act 1847 c 105
 Turnpike Roads (Ireland) Act 1847 c 35
 Vagrancy (Ireland) Act 1847 c 84
 Van Diemen's Land Company Act 1847 c 57
 Waterworks Clauses Act 1847 c 17

Local acts
 Ayrshire and Galloway (Smithstown and Dalmellington) Railway Act 1847 c x

1847 & 1848 (11 & 12 Vict.)
 Aliens Act 1848 c 20
 Appeals on Civil Bills, Dublin Act 1848 c 34
 Appropriation Act 1848 c 126
 Army Prize Money Act 1848 c 103
 Assessionable Manors Award Act 1848 c 83
 Bankrupts Release Act 1848 c 86
 Bonded Warehouses Act 1848 c 122
 Borough Police Act 1848 c 14
 Caledonian Canal Act 1848 c 54
 Canada Union Act 1848 c 56
 Chelsea and Greenwich Out-pensioners, etc. Act 1848 c 84
 Church Building Act 1848 c 37
 Church Building Commission Act 1848 c 71
 Constabulary (Ireland) Act 1848 c 72
 Contagious Disorders (Sheep), etc. Act 1848 c 107
 County Cess (Ireland) Act 1848 c 32
 Court of Chancery Act 1848 c 10
 Court of Chancery Offices Act 1848 c 94
 Criminal Procedure Act 1848 c 46
 Crown Cases Act 1848 c 78
 Crown Lands Act 1848 c 102
 Debts Recovery Act 1848 c 87
 Diocese of Norwich Act 1848 c 61
 Diplomatic Relations with See of Rome Act 1848 c 108
 Disfranchisement of Freemen, Great Yarmouth Act 1848 c 24
 Distillation of Spirits from Sugar, etc. Act 1848 c 100
 Dublin Police Act 1848 c 113
 Duties on Copper and Lead Act 1848 c 127
 Duties on Spirits Act 1848 c 60
 Ecclesiastical Jurisdiction Act 1848 c 67
 Ecclesiastical Patronage (Ireland) Act 1848 c 76
 Ecclesiastical Unions, etc. (Ireland) Act 1848 c 41
 Election Petitions Act 1848 c 98
 Election Recognizances Act 1848 c 18
 Entail Amendment Act 1848 c 36
 Eviction (Ireland) Act 1848 c 47
 Exchange of Crown Advowsons Act 1848 c 57
 Exchequer Bills Act 1848 c 16
 Excise Act 1848 c 118
 Execution (Ireland) Act 1848 c 28
 Fever (Ireland) Act 1848 c 131
 Fines and Recoveries Act 1848 c 70
 Fisheries (Ireland) Act 1848 c 92
 Government of New Zealand Act 1848 c 5
 Grand Jury Cess (Ireland) Act 1848 c 26
 Habeas Corpus Suspension (Ireland) Act 1848 c 35
 Hares Act 1848 c 29
 Hares (Scotland) Act 1848 c 30
 Highway Rates Act 1848 c 66
 Importation of Sheep Act 1848 c 105
 Inclosure Act 1848 c 99
 Inclosures Act 1848 c 109
 Inclosures (Provisional Orders) Act 1848 c 27
 Income Tax Act 1848 c 8
 Incorporation of Boroughs Act 1848 c 93
 Incumbered Estates (Ireland) Act 1848 c 48
 Indemnity Act 1848 c 19
 Indian Insolvency Act 1848 c 21
 Indictable Offences Act 1848 c 42
 Insolvent Debtors, Court Act 1848 c 77
 Irish Reproductive Loan Fund Act 1848 c 115
 Islands of Tobago, etc. Act 1848 c 22
 Joint Stock Companies Act 1848 c 45
 Justices Protection Act 1848 c 44
 Justiciary (Scotland) Act 1848 c 79
 Juvenile Offenders (Ireland) Act 1848 c 59
 Labouring Poor (Ireland) Act 1848 c 106
 Land Tax Commissioners Act 1848 c 62
 Land Transfer (Ireland) Act 1848 c 120
 Liqueur Act 1848 c 121
 Loan Societies Act 1848 c 64
 Local Acts, Preliminary Inquiries Act 1848 c 129
 Lock-up Houses Act 1848 c 101
 London Bridge Approaches Act 1848 c 124
 Malicious Injuries (Ireland) Act 1848 c 69
 Marine Mutiny Act 1848 c 15
 Metropolitan Commissioners of Sewers Act 1848 c 112
 Militia Ballots Suspension Act 1848 c 65
 Militia Pay Act 1848 c 75
 Millbank Prison Act 1848 c 104
 Mining Leases (Ireland) Act 1848 c 13
 Mutiny Act 1848 c 11
 National Debt Act 1848 c 125
 National Monument in Scotland Act 1848 c 23
 Naval Medical Supplement Fund Society Act 1848 c 58
 Nuisances Removal, etc. Act 1848 c 123
 Parliamentary Elections Act 1848 c 90
 Passengers to North America Act 1848 c 6
 Paymaster General Act 1848 c 55
 Poor Law Amendment Act 1848 c 110
 Poor Law Audit Act 1848 c 91
 Poor Law Auditors Act 1848 c 114
 Poor Law Procedure Act 1848 c. 31. Sometimes called the County Law Procedure Act 1848.
 Poor Law (Schools) Act 1848 c 82
 Poor Rates Act 1848 c 85
 Poor Relief (Ireland) Act 1848 c 25
 Poor Removal Act 1848 c 111
 Post Office Act 1848 c 117
 Post Office (Money Orders) Act 1848 c 88
 Prevention of Crime (Ireland) Act 1848 c 2
 Prisons Act 1848 c 39
 Public Health Act 1848 c 63
 Public Money Drainage Act 1848 c 119
 Public Works (Ireland) Act 1848 c 1
 Public Works (Ireland) Act 1848 c 17
 Public Works (Ireland) Act 1848 c 51
 Queen's Prison Act 1848 c 7
 Railways Act 1848 c 3
 Regent's Quadrant Colonnade Act 1848 c 50
 Registers of Sasines (Scotland) Act 1848 c 74
 Roads and Bridges (Scotland) Act 1848 c 40
 Sale of Beer, etc. on Sunday Act 1848 c 49
 Salmon Fisheries Act 1848 c 52
 Savings Banks (Ireland) Act 1848 c 133
 Slave Trade Act 1848 c 116
 Slave Trade (Muscat) Act 1848 c 128
 Stamp Duties Act 1848 c 9
 Steam Navigation Act 1848 c 81
 Sugar Duties Act 1848 c 97
 Summary Jurisdiction Act 1848 c 43
 Supply Act 1848 c 33
 Supply Act 1848 c 4
 Taxing Masters (Ireland) Act 1848 c 132
 Tithe Rentcharge (Ireland) Act 1848 c 80
 Treason Felony Act 1848 c 12
 Trustees Relief (Ireland) Act 1848 c 68
 Turnpike Acts Continuance Act 1848 c 96
 Turnpike Acts (Ireland) Act 1848 c 73
 Unlawful Combinations (Ireland) Act 1848 c 89
 West India Loans Act 1848 c 38
 West Indian Loans Act 1848 c 130
 Windsor Castle Act 1848 c 53
 Wolverhampton Parish Act 1848 c 95

1849 (12 & 13 Vict.)

Public General Acts
 Admiralty Offences (Colonial) Act 1849 c 96
 Appropriation Act 1849 c 98
 Army Enlistment Act 1849 c 73
 Assaults (Ireland) Act 1849 c 38
 Bankruptcy (Ireland) Act 1849 c 107
 Bankruptcy Law Consolidation Act 1849 c 106
 Boroughs, Relief from County Expenditure Act 1849 c 82
 Buckinghamshire Assizes Act 1849 c 6
 Chapels of Ease, etc. (Ireland) Act 1849 c 99
 Coin Act 1849 c 41
 Colonial Inland Post Office Act 1849 c 66
 Consular Marriages Act 1849 c 68
 County Cess. (Ireland) Act 1849 c 36
 County Courts Act 1849 c 101
 County Rates within Boroughs Act 1849 c 65
 Cruelty to Animals Act 1849 c 92
 Customs Act 1849 c 90
 Distress for Rates Act 1849 c 14
 Drainage of Lands Act 1849 c 100
 Dublin, Collection of Rates Act 1849 c 91
 Dublin Corporation Act 1849 c 85
 Dublin Improvement Act 1849 c 97
 Ecclesiastical Jurisdiction Act 1849 c 39
 Exchequer Bills Act 1849 c 20
 Grand Jury Cess. (Ireland) Act 1849 c 32
 Greenwich Markets Act 1849 c 28
 Guardians (Ireland) Act 1849 c 4
 Habeas Corpus Suspension (Ireland) Act 1849 c 2
 Highway Rates Act 1849 c 54
 Highways Returns Act 1849 c 35
 House of Commons Offices Act 1849 c 72
 House of Lords Costs Taxation Act 1849 c 78
 Improvement of Land (Ireland) Act 1849 c 23
 Inclosure Act 1849 c 57
 Inclosure Act 1849 c 83
 Inclosures Act 1849 c 7
 Incumbered Estates (Ireland) Act 1849 c 77
 Indemnity Act 1849 c 9
 Indictable Offences (Ireland) Act 1849 c 69
 Inland Revenue Board Act 1849 c 1
 Inland Revenue Officers Act 1849 c 58
 Joint Stock Companies Act 1849 c 108
 Judgments (Ireland) Act 1849 c 95
 Judicial Factors Act 1849 c 51
 Justices of the Peace Small Debt (Scotland) Act 1849 c 34. Sometimes called the Justices of the Peace Small Debts (Scotland) Act 1849.
 Justices Protection (Ireland) Act 1849 c 16
 Land Grants, New South Wales Act 1849 c 22
 Landed Property Improvement (Ireland) Act 1849 c 59
 Larceny Act 1849 c 11
 Lease Act 1849 c 110
 Leases Act 1849 c 26
 Loan Societies Act 1849 c 37
 Lunatic Asylums (Ireland) Act 1849 c 56
 Marine Mutiny Act 1849 c 12
 Metropolitan Sewers Act 1849 c 93
 Midland Great Western Railway Act 1849 c 62
 Militia Ballots Suspension Act 1849 c 52
 Militia Pay Act 1849 c 75
 Mutiny Act 1849 c 10
 Mutiny, etc., East Indies Act 1849 c 43
 Navigation Act 1849 c 29
 New Forest and Waltham Forest Act 1849 c 81
 New Zealand Company Act 1849 c 79
 Newfoundland Act 1849 c 21
 Newgate Gaol, Dublin, etc. Act 1849 c 55
 Nuisances, Removal, etc. Act 1849 c 111
 Offences Against Women Act 1849 c 76
 Passengers Act 1849 c 33
 Petty Bag Act 1849 c 109
 Petty Sessions Act 1849 c 18
 Pilotage Act 1849 c 88
 Poor (Ireland) Act 1849 c 60
 Poor Law Amendment Act 1849 c 103
 Poor Law (Justices Jurisdiction) Act 1849 c 64
 Poor Law (Overseers) Act 1849 c 8
 Poor Rates Act 1849 c 61
 Poor Relief Act 1849 c 13
 Poor Relief (Ireland) Act 1849 c 104
 Portuguese Deserters Act 1849 c 25
 Prisoners Removal (Ireland) Act 1849 c 19
 Public Health Supplemental Act 1849 c 94
 Quarter Sessions Act 1849 c 45
 Rate in Aid of Distressed Unions Act 1849 c 24
 Recovery of Wages (Ireland) Act 1849 c 15
 Regimental Benefit Societies Act 1849 c 71
 Relief of Distress (Ireland) Act 1849 c 5
 Relief of Distress (Ireland) Act 1849 c 63
 Renewable Leasehold Conversion Act 1849 c 105
 Royal Pavilion, Brighton, etc. Act 1849 c 102
 School Sites Act 1849 c 49
 Sequestration Act 1849 c 67
 Sewers Act 1849 c 50
 Sheep Stealers (Ireland) Act 1849 c 30
 Sheriff of Westmorland Act 1849 c 42
 Slave Trade Act 1849 c 84
 Soap Duties Allowances Act 1849 c 40
 Solicitors (Ireland) Act 1849 c 53
 Spirits (Ireland) Act 1849 c 17
 Stamps Act 1849 c 80
 Summary Convictions (Ireland) Act 1849 c 70
 Supply Act 1849 c 3
 Supply Act 1849 c 44
 Transportation (Ireland) Act 1849 c 27
 Treasury Instruments (Signature) Act 1849 c 89
 Trustees Relief Act 1849 c 74
 Turnpike Acts Continuance Act 1849 c 87
 Turnpike Acts (Ireland) Act 1849 c 47
 Turnpike Roads (Scotland) Act 1849 c 31
 Union of Turnpike Trusts Act 1849 c 46
 Vancouver's Island Act 1849 c 48
 Workhouses (Ireland) Act 1849 c 86

Local Acts
 Black Sluice Drainage (Amendment) Act 1849 c. lix
 City of London Municipal Elections Act 1849 c. xciv

1850 – 1859

1850 (13 & 14 Vict.)

Public General Acts
 Abandonment of Railways Act 1850 c 83
 Annual Inclosure Act 1850 c 8. Sometimes called the Inclosures Act 1850.
 Annual Turnpike Acts Continuance Act 1850 c 79
 Annuities to Duke and Princess Mary of Cambridge Act 1850 c 77
 Appropriation Act 1850 c 107
 Assessed Taxes Composition Act 1850 c 96
 Assizes (Ireland) Act 1850 c 85
 Attachment of Goods (Ireland) Act 1850 c 73
 Australian Constitutions Act 1850 c 59
 Borough Justices Act 1850 c 91
 Brewers' Licensing Act 1850 c 67
 Brick Duties Repeal Act 1850 c 9
 Bridges Act 1850 c 64
 Bridges (Ireland) Act 1850 c 4
 Canterbury Association (New Zealand) Act 1850 c 70
 Census, Great Britain Act 1850 c 53
 Census (Ireland) Act 1850 c 44
 Coal Mines Inspection Act 1850 c 100
 Convict Prisons Act 1850 c 39
 Copyright of Designs Act 1850 c 104
 Corporation of Dublin Act 1850 c 55
 County Cess. (Ireland) Act 1850 c 1
 County Courts Act 1850 c 61
 Court of Chancery (England) Act 1850 c 35
 Court of Chancery (Ireland) Regulation Act 1850 c 89
 Court of Chancery of Lancaster Act 1850 c 43
 Court of Common Pleas Act 1850 c 75
 Court of Session Act 1850 c 36
 Crime and Outrage (Ireland) Act 1850 c 106
 Cruelty to Animals (Scotland) Act 1850 c 92
 Customs Act 1850 c 95
 Customs (Manchester Bonding) Act 1850 c 84
 Distressed Unions Advances (Ireland) Act 1850 c 14
 Division of Deanery of Saint Burian Act 1850 c 76
 Dublin Corporation Act 1850 c 81
 Ecclesiastical Commissioners Act 1850 c 94
 Ecclesiastical Jurisdiction Act 1850 c 47
 Equivalent Company Act 1850 c 63
 Exchequer Bills Act 1850 c 10
 Exchequer Bills Act 1850 c 22
 Exchequer Equitable Jurisdiction (Ireland) Act 1850 c 51
 Factories Act 1850 c 54
 Fairs and Markets Act 1850 c 23
 Fisheries (Ireland) Act 1850 c 88
 Friendly Societies Act 1850 c 115
 Grand Jury Cess (Ireland) Act 1850 c 82
 Greenwich Hospital Act 1850 c 24
 Highway Rates Act 1850 c 58
 Holyhead Harbour Act 1850 c 111
 Improvement of Land (Ireland) Act 1850 c 113
 Inclosures Act 1850 c 66
 Incorporation of Boroughs Act 1850 c 42
 Indemnity Act 1850 c 12
 Interpretation Act 1850 c 21
 Judgment Mortgage (Ireland) Act 1850 c 29
 Judgments Registry (Ireland) Act 1850 c 74
 Justice of Assizes Act 1850 c 25
 Larceny Act 1850 c 37
 Leases Act 1850 c 17
 Liberties Act 1850 c 105
 Linen, etc., Manufactures (Ireland) Act 1850 c 48
 Loan Societies Act 1850 c 45
 London Bridge Approaches Act 1850 c 103
 London Hackney Carriages Act 1850 c 7
 Lough Corrib Act 1850 c 112
 Marine Mutiny Act 1850 c 6
 Marlborough House Settlement Act 1850 c 78
 Marriages Confirmation Act 1850 c 38
 Mercantile Marine Act 1850 c 93
 Metropolitan Interments Act 1850 c 52
 Militia Ballots Suspension Act 1850 c 46
 Militia Pay Act 1850 c 49
 Mutiny Act 1850 c 5
 National Gallery and Museums (Scotland) Act 1850 c 86
 Naval Prize Act 1850 c 40
 Navy Pay Act 1850 c 62
 Parish Constables Act 1850 c 20
 Parish of Manchester Division Act 1850 c 41
 Parliamentary Elections (Ireland) Act 1850 c 68
 Party Processions (Ireland) Act 1850 c 2
 Piracy Act 1850 c 26
 (Pirates (Head Money) Repeal Act Commencement) c 27
 Pluralities Act 1850 c 98
 Police (Scotland) Act 1850 c 33
 Police Superannuation Fund Act 1850 c 87
 Poor Law Amendment Act 1850 c 101
 Poor Rates Act 1850 c 50
 Portland Harbour Act 1850 c 116
 Public Health Supplemental Act 1850 c 32
 Public Health Supplemental (No. 2) Act 1850 c 90
 Public Health Supplemental (No. 3) Act 1850 c 108
 Public Libraries Act 1850 c 65
 Public Money Drainage Act 1850 c 31
 Rating of Small Tenements Act 1850 c 99
 Registration of Assurances (Ireland) Act 1850 c 72
 Religious Congregations, etc. (Scotland) Act 1850 c 13
 Repeal of Part of 15 George 3. c. 31 Act 1850 c 80
 Representation of the People (Ireland) Act 1850 c 69
 Savings Banks (Ireland) Act 1850 c 110
 School Districts Act 1850 c 11
 Sheep and Cattle Disease Prevention Act 1850 c 71
 Sheriff of Westmorland Act 1850 c 30
 Spitalfields Improvements Act 1850 c 109
 Stamp Duties (Ireland) Act 1850 c 114
 Stamp Duties Act 1850 c 97
 Summary Jurisdiction (Ireland) Act 1850 c 102
 Supply Act 1850 c 3
 Supreme Court (England) Act 1850 c 16
 Supreme Court (Ireland) Act 1850 c 18
 Supreme Court (Ireland) Act 1850 c 19
 Trustee Act 1850 c 60
 Trustee Appointment Act 1850 c 28
 Turnpike Acts (Ireland) Continuance Act 1850 c 34
 Usury Act 1850 c 56
 Vestries Act 1850 c 57
 West Indian Courts of Appeal Act 1850 c 15

Private Acts
 Railway Clearing Act 1850 c 33

1851 (14 & 15 Vict.)

Public General Acts
 Absconding Debtors Arrest Act 1851 c 52
 Annual Inclosure Act 1851 c 2
 Annual Turnpike Acts Continuance Act 1851 c 37
 Appointment of Vice-Chancellor Act 1851 c 4
 Appropriation Act 1851 c 101
 Arsenic Act 1851 c 13
 Assessed Taxes Act 1851 c 33
 Battersea Park Act 1851 c 77
 Bridges (Ireland) Act 1851 c 21
 Canterbury Association (New Zealand) Act 1851 c 84
 Chancery (Ireland) Act 1851 c 15
 Charities (Service of Notice) Act 1851 c 56
 Chief Justice's Salary Act 1851 c 41
 Church Building Act 1851 c 97
 Church of Ireland Act 1851 c 72
 Church of Ireland Acts Repeal Act 1851 c 71
 Civil Bill Courts (Ireland) Act 1851 c 57
 Coalwhippers (Port of London) Act 1851 c 78. Sometimes called the Coalwhippers London Act 1851.
 Common Lodging Houses Act 1851 c 28
 Commons Law Courts (Ireland) Act 1851 c 17
 Compound Householders Act 1851 c 14
 Constabulary (Ireland) Act 1851 c 85
 Court of Chancery Act 1851 c 83
 Criminal Justice Administration Act 1851 c 55
 Criminal Procedure Act 1851 c 100
 Crown Estate Paving Act 1851 c 95. Sometimes called the Crown Paving Act 1851.
 Crown Lands (Copyholds) Act 1851 c 46
 Crown Lands Act 1851 c 42
 Customs Act 1851 c 62
 Ecclesiastical Jurisdiction Act 1851 c 29
 Ecclesiastical Property Valuation (Ireland) Act 1851 c 74
 Ecclesiastical Titles Act 1851 c 60
 Emigration from Scotland Act 1851 c 91
 Episcopal and Capitular Estates Act 1851 c 104
 Evidence Act 1851 c 99
 Exchequer Bills Act 1851 c 9
 Fee-Farm Rents (Ireland) Act 1851 c 20
 Fines Act (Ireland) 1851 c 90. Also called the Fines (Ireland) Act 1851.
 Glebe (Ireland) Act 1851 c 73
 Grand Jury Cess (Dublin) Act 1851 c 65
 Great Seal Act 1851 c 82
 Gunpowder in Mersey Act 1851 c 67
 Hainault Forest Act 1851 c 43
 Herring Fishery Act 1851 c 26
 High Peak Mining Customs and Mineral Courts Act 1851 c 94
 Highland Roads and Bridges Act 1851 c 66
 Highway Rates Act 1851 c 30
 Highways, South Wales Act 1851 c 16
 House Tax Act 1851 c 36
 Inclosure Commissioners Act 1851 c 53
 Income Tax Act 1851 c 12
 Indemnity Act 1851 c 10
 Labouring Classes Lodging Houses Act 1851 c 34
 Landlord and Tenant Act 1851 c 25
 Leases for Mills (Ireland) Act 1851 c 7
 Loan Societies Act 1851 c 31
 Loans for Public Works (Ireland) Act 1851 c 51
 Lunatic Asylums (Ireland) Act 1851 c 45
 Lunatics Removal (India) Act 1851 c 81
 Marine Mutiny Act 1851 c 5
 Marriages, India Act 1851 c 40
 Mercantile Marine Act Amendment Act 1851 c 96
 Metropolitan Interment Act 1851 c 89
 Metropolitan Market Act 1851 c 61
 Metropolitan Sewers Act 1851 c 75
 Militia Ballots Suspension Act 1851 c 32
 Militia Pay Act 1851 c 58
 Mutiny Act 1851 c 6
 Naval Apprentices (Ireland) Act 1851 c 35
 New Brunswick Boundary Act 1851 c 63
 New Forest Act 1851 c 76
 New Zealand Settlements Act 1851 c 86
 Passengers by Sea Act 1851 c 1
 Petty Sessions (Ireland) Act 1851 c 93
 Poor Law (Apprentices, &c.) Act 1851 c 11
 Poor Law Amendment Act 1851 c 105
 Poor Rates Act 1851 c 47
 Poor Relief (Ireland) Act 1851 c 68. Also known as the Medical Charities Act.
 Preliminary Inquiries Act 1851 c 49
 Prevention of Offences Act 1851 c 19
 Prisons (Scotland) Act 1851 c 27
 Protection of Inventions Act 1851 c 8
 Public Health Supplemental Act for Great Yarmouth 1851 c 80
 Public Health Supplemental Act, 1851, No. 2 c 98. Sometimes called the Public Health Supplemental No. 2 Act 1851.
 Public Health Supplemental Act 1851 (No. 3) c 103
 Public Works Loans Act 1851 c 23
 Railway Regulation Act 1851 c 64
 Railways Act (Ireland) 1851 c 70. Also called the Railways (Ireland) Act 1851.
 Rating of Small Tenements Act 1851 c 39
 Representative Peers (Scotland) Act 1851 c 87
 School Sites Act 1851 c 24
 Seamen's Fund Winding-up Act 1851 c 102
 Second Annual Inclosure Act 1851 c 54
 Sheep, etc., Diseases Act 1851 c 69
 Soap Duties Allowances Act 1851 c 59
 Solicitors Act 1851 c 88
 St. Alban's Bribery Commission Act 1851 c 106
 Stamps Act 1851 c 18
 Steam Navigation Act 1851 c 79
 Summary Jurisdiction (Ireland) Act 1851 c 92
 Supply Act 1851 c 3
 Survey, Great Britain Act 1851 c 22
 Tithe Rating Act 1851 c 50. Sometimes called the Tithes Rating Act 1851.
 Turnpike Acts Continuance (Ireland) Act 1851 c 44
 Turnpike Trusts: Making of Provisional Orders Act 1851 c 38
 Unlawful Oaths (Ireland) Act 1851 c 48

Local Acts
 Royal Naval School Amendment Act 1851 c. xxix

1852

15 & 16 Vict.
 Annual Inclosure Act 1852 c 2. Sometimes called the Inclosures Act 1852.
 Annual Turnpike Acts Continuance Act 1852 c 58. Sometimes called the Turnpike Acts, Great Britain Act 1852.
 Appropriation Act 1852 c 82
 Bankruptcy Act 1852 c 77
 Belfast Custom House Act 1852 c 30
 Bishop of Quebec Act 1852 c 53
 Bishopric of Christ Church, New Zealand Act 1852 c 88
 Burghs (Scotland) Act 1852 c 32
 Burial Act 1852 c 85
 Colonial Bishops Act 1852 c 52
 Commissioners of Works Act 1852 c 28
 Common Law Courts Act 1852 c 73
 Common Law Procedure Act 1852 c 76
 Copyhold Act 1852 c 51
 County Courts Act 1852 c 54
 County Rates Act 1852 c 81
 Court of Chancery Act 1852 c 87
 Court of Chancery Procedure Act 1852 c 86
 Crime and Outrage (Ireland) Act 1852 c 66
 Crown Lands Act 1852 c 62
 Crown Revenues (Colonies) Act 1852 c 39
 Differential Duties on Foreign Ships Act 1852 c 47
 Disfranchisement of St. Alban's Act 1852 c 9
 Distressed Unions (Ireland) Act 1852 c 68
 Ecclesiastical Jurisdiction Act 1852 c 17
 Election Commissioners Act 1852 c 57
 Estates of Intestates, etc. Act 1852 c 3
 Evidence (Scotland) Act 1852 c 27
 Exchequer Bills Act 1852 c 10
 First Public Health Supplemental Act 1852 c 42
 Foreign Deserters Act 1852 c 26
 Friendly Societies Act 1852 c 65
 General Register Office Act 1852 c 25
 Highway Rates Act 1852 c 19
 Holloway Prison Act 1852 c 70
 Huddersfield Burial Ground Act 1852 c 41
 Inclosure Act 1852 c 79. Sometimes called the Inclosures Act 1852.
 Income Tax Act 1852 c 20
 Incumbered Estates (Ireland) Act 1852 c 67
 Indemnity Act 1852 c 4
 Industrial and Provident Societies Act 1852 c 31
 Inland Revenue Office Act 1852 c 40
 International Copyright Act 1852 c 12
 Justices Jurisdiction Act 1852 c 38
 Kennington Common Act 1852 c 29
 Landed Property Improvement (Ireland) Act 1852 c 34
 Linen, etc., Manufacturers (Ireland) Act 1852 c 13
 Loan Societies Act 1852 c 15
 Marine Mutiny Act 1852 c 8
 Master in Chancery Abolition Act 1852 c 80
 Meeting of Parliament Act 1852 c 23
 Metropolis Water Act 1852 c 84
 Metropolitan Sewers Act 1852 c 64
 Militia Act 1852 c 50
 Militia Ballots Suspension Act 1852 c 75
 Militia Pay Act 1852 c 74
 Municipal Corporations Act 1852 c 5
 Mutiny Act 1852 c 7
 Navy Pay Act 1852 c 46
 New Zealand Constitution Act 1852 c 72
 Parliamentary Oaths Act 1852 c 43
 Passengers Act 1852 c 44
 Patent Law Amendment Act 1852 c 83
 Penalties, etc., under Excise Acts 1852 c 61
 Pharmacy Act 1852 c 56
 Pimlico Improvements Act 1852 c 78
 Poor Law Boards (England) Act 1852 c 59
 Poor Law Commission (Ireland) Act 1852 c 37
 Poor Law Union Charges Act 1852 c 14
 Poor Rates Act 1852 c 18
 Property of Lunatics Act 1852 c 48
 Protection of Inventions Act 1852 c 6
 Protestant Dissenters Act 1852 c 36
 Public Health Supplemental Act 1852 (No. 2) c 69. Sometimes called the Public Health Supplemental (No. 2) Act 1852.
 Repayment of Advances (Ireland) Act 1852 c 16
 Representative Peers (Scotland) Act 1852 c 35
 Savings Banks Act 1852 c 60
 School Sites Act 1852 c 49
 Sheep, etc., Disorders Prevention Act 1852 c 11
 Stamps Act 1852 c 21
 Supply Act 1852 c 1
 Thames Embankment Act 1852 c 71
 Trustee Act 1852 c 55
 Turnpike Acts (Ireland) Act 1852 c 22
 Turnpike Debts Act 1852 c 33
 Turnpike Roads in Yorkshire Act 1852 c 45
 Valuation (Ireland) Act 1852 c 63
 Wills Act Amendment Act 1852 c 24

16 & 17 Vict.
 Bank Notes Act 1852 c 2
 Bills and Notes, Metropolis Act 1852 c 1
 Second Annual Inclosure Act 1852 c 3. Sometimes called the Inclosures Act 1852.
 South American Loans Guarantee Act 1852 c 4

1853 (16 & 17 Vict.)

Public General Acts
 Annual Inclosure Act 1853 c 11
 Annual Turnpike Acts Continuance Act 1853 c 135. Sometimes called the Turnpike Roads (England) Act 1853.
 Apprehension of Certain Offenders Act 1853 c 118
 Appropriation Act 1853 c 110
 Bail in Error Act 1853 c 32
 Bankers' Composition (Scotland) Act 1853 c 63
 Bankruptcy (Scotland) Act 1853 c 53
 Bankruptcy Court Act 1853 c 81
 Battersea Park Act 1853 c 47
 Belfast Borough Extension Act 1853 c 114
 Berwickshire Courts Act 1853 c 27
 Betting Act 1853 c 119
 Burgh Council Elections (Scotland) Act 1853 c 26
 Burgh Harbours (Scotland) Act 1853 c 93
 Burial Act 1853 c 134
 Care and Treatment of Lunatics Act 1853 c 96
 Cathedral Churches, etc. Act 1853 c 35
 Charitable Trusts Act 1853 c 137
 Christ College of Brecknock Act 1853 c 82
 Clergy Reserves, Canada Act 1853 c 21
 Coinage (Colonial Offences) Act 1853 c 48
 Colonial Bishops Act 1853 c 49
 Commissioners for Oaths Act 1853 c 78
 Common Law Procedure Amendment Act (Ireland) 1853 or the Common Law Procedure Amendment (Ireland) Act 1853 c 113
 Common Lodging Houses Act 1853 c 41. Sometimes called the Common Lodging House Act 1853.
 Confirmation of Marriages Act 1853 c 122
 Consolidated Annuities (Ireland) Act 1853 c 75
 Contagious Diseases (Animals) Act 1853 c 62
 Convict Prisons Act 1853 c 121
 Convicted Prisoners Removal, etc. Act 1853 c 43
 Copyhold, etc., Commission Act 1853 c 124
 Copyholds Act 1853 c 57
 County Elections (Scotland) Act 1853 c 28
 Court of Chancery (England) Act 1853 c 98
 Court of Chancery Examiners Act 1853 c 22
 Crime and Outrage (Ireland) Act 1853 c 72
 Criminal Procedure Act 1853 c 30
 Crown Lands Act 1853 c 56
 Customs Act 1853 c 54
 Customs Tariff Act 1853 c 106. Sometimes called the Customs Act 1853.
 Customs Consolidation Act 1853 c 107. Sometimes called the Customs Act 1853.
 Defacing the Coin Act 1853 c 102
 Drainage and Improvement of Lands (Ireland) Act 1853 c 130
 Dublin Carriage Act 1853 c 112
 Dublin Parliamentary Revising Act (1853) c 58
 Duties on Horses Let for Hire Act 1853 c 88
 Duties on Spirits, etc. Act 1853 c 37
 Ecclesiastical Commissioners (Exchange of Patronage) Act 1853 c 50
 Ecclesiastical Jurisdiction Act 1853 c 108
 Entail Amendment Act 1853 c 94
 Evidence Amendment Act 1853 c 83
 Evidence (Scotland) Act 1853 c 20
 Exchequer Bills Act 1853 c 25
 Factories Act 1853 c 104
 Government Annuities Act 1853 c 45
 Government of India Act 1853 c 95
 Grand Jury (Ireland) Act 1853 c 136
 Grand Jury Cess. (Ireland) Act 1853 c 13
 Highway Rates Act 1853 c 66
 Income Tax Act 1853 c 34
 Income Tax (Insurance) Act 1853 c 91
 Incumbered Estates (Ireland) Act 1853 c 64
 Indemnity Act 1853 c 14
 Investments of Friendly Societies Act 1853 c 123
 Land Tax Commissioners (Appointment) Act 1853 c 111
 Land Tax Redemption Act 1853 c 74
 Land Tax Redemption (No. 2) Act 1853 c 117
 Land Tax Redemption (Investment) Act 1853 c 90
 Liberated Africans Act 1853 c 86. Sometimes called the Sierra Leone Act 1853.
 Licensing (Scotland) Act 1853 c 67
 Linen, etc., Manufacturers (Ireland) Act 1853 c 103
 Loan Societies Act 1853 c 109
 London Hackney Carriage Act 1853 c 33
 London Hackney Carriage (No. 2) Act 1853 c 127
 Lunacy Regulation Act 1853 c 70
 Lunatic Asylums Act 1853 c 97
 Malicious Injuries (Ireland) Act 1853 c 38. Sometimes called the Malicious Injuries (Northern Ireland) Act 1853.
 Marine Mutiny Act 1853 c 10
 Merchant Shipping Law Amendment Act 1853 c 131
 Metropolitan Improvements (Repayment out of Consolidated Fund) Act 1853 c 18. Sometimes called the Metropolitan Improvements Act 1853.
 Metropolitan Sewers Act 1853 c 125
 Militia Act 1853 c 133
 Militia Pay Act 1853 c 116
 Municipal Corporation Act 1853 c 79. Sometimes called the Municipal Corporations Act 1853.
 Mutiny Act 1853 c 9
 National Debt Act 1853 c 23
 National Debt Act 1853 c 132
 Naval Enlistment Act 1853 c 69
 Naval Volunteers Act 1853 c 73
 New Forest Deer Removed Act 1853 c 19
 Newspapers Act 1853 c 71
 Parliamentary Elections Act 1853 c 68
 Parliamentary Elections (Polling) Act 1853 c 15
 Passengers Act Amendment Act 1853 c 84
 Patent Law Act 1853 c 5
 Patent Law Act 1853 c 115
 Penal Servitude Act 1853 c 99
 Pilotage Law Amendment Act 1853 c 129
 Pimlico Improvement Act 1853 c 44
 Poor Law Union Charges Act 1853 c 77
 Poor Rates Act 1853 c 105
 Privy Council Registrar Act 1853 c 85
 Provisional Order Confirmation (Turnpike Debts) Act 1853 c 61
 Public Health Supplemental Act 1853 (No. 1) c 24. Sometimes called the Public Health Supplemental (No. 1) Act 1853.
 Public Health Supplemental Act 1853 (No. 2) c 126
 Public Libraries Act 1853 c 101
 Public Works Loan Act 1853 c 40. Sometimes called the Public Works Loans Act 1853.
 Resident Magistrates (Ireland) Act 1853 c 60
 Second Annual Inclosure Act 1853 c. 120. Sometimes called the Inclosures Act 1853.
 Sheriff Courts (Scotland) Act 1853 c 80
 Sheriffs (Scotland) Act 1853 c 92
 Slave Trade Suppression, Treaties with Sohar and New Granada Act 1853 c 16
 Slave Trade Suppression, Treaties with Sohar and New Granada Act 1853 c 17
 Smoke Abatement, London Act 1853 c 128
 Soap Duties Repeal Act 1853 c 39
 Somerset House Act 1853 c 8
 Spitalfields and Shoreditch New Street Act 1853 c 52
 Stamp Act 1853 c 59
 Succession Duty Act 1853 c 51
 Supply Act 1853 c 12
 Supply Act 1853 c 31
 Taxing Officer (Ireland) Act 1853 c 55
 Thames Embankment Act 1853 c 87
 Transfer of Aids Act 1853 c 6
 Turnpike Acts (Ireland) Act 1853 c 76
 Universities (Scotland) Act 1853 c 89
 Vaccination Act 1853 c 100
 Valuation (Ireland) Act 1853 c 7
 Vestries Act 1853 c 65
 Weights in Sales of Bullion Act 1853 c 29
 Westminster Bridge Act 1853 c 46
 Whichwood Disafforesting Act 1853 c 36. Sometimes called the Whichwood Forest Act 1853.
 Whittlewood Disafforesting Act 1853 c 42

Local Acts
 Barnsley Waterworks Act 1853 c. cvii

1854 (17 & 18 Vict.)

Public General Acts
 Acknowledgement of Deeds by Married Women Act 1854 c 75
 Admiralty Court Act 1854 c 78. Sometimes called the Court of Admiralty Act 1854.
 Advances to County of Mayo Act 1854 c 110
 Annual Inclosure Act 1854 c 9
 Annual Turnpike Acts Continuance Act 1854 c. 58. Sometimes called the Turnpike Roads (England) Act 1854.
 Appropriation Act 1854 c 121
 Assessed Taxes Act 1854 c 1
 Attendance of Witnesses Act 1854 c 34
 Augmentation of Benefices Act 1854 c 84
 Bankers (Scotland) Act 1854 c 73
 Bankruptcy Act 1854 c 119
 Bills of Sale Act 1854 c 36
 Bills of Sale (Ireland) Act 1854 c 55
 Borough Rates (England) Act 1854 c 71
 Boundary Survey (Ireland) Act 1854 c 17
 Burial Act 1854 c 87
 Church Building Act 1854 c 32
 Church Building Commission Act 1854 c 14
 Church Temporalities Act 1854 c 11
 Coasting Trade Act 1854 c 5
 Common Law Procedure Act 1854 c 125
 Commonwealth Legislative Council for Canada Act 1854 c 118
 Confirmation of Marriages Act 1854 c 88
 Convict Prisons (Ireland) Act 1854 c 76. Sometimes called the Convict Prisons Act 1854.
 Corrupt Practices Prevention Act 1854 c 102
 County Courts Act 1854 c 16
 Court of Chancery Act 1854 c 100
 Court of Chancery of Lancaster Act 1854 c 82
 Crime and Outrage (Ireland) Act 1854 c 92
 Crown Land, Revenues Act 1854 c 68
 Cruelty to Animals Act 1854 c 60
 Customs Act 1854 c 28
 Customs Act 1854 c 29
 Customs Act 1854 c 122
 Defence Act 1854 c 67
 Dublin Amended Carriage Act 1854 c 45
 Duchy of Cornwall Office Act 1854 c 93
 Ecclesiastical Courts Act 1854 c 47
 Ecclesiastical Jurisdiction Act 1854 c 65
 Episcopal and Capitular Estates Act 1854 c 116
 Exchequer Bills Act 1854 c 3
 Exchequer Bills Act 1854 c 12
 Exchequer Bonds and Bills Act 1854 c 23
 Excise Act 1854 c 27
 Friendly Societies Act 1854 c 101
 Friendly Societies Discharge Act 1854 c 56
 Gaming Houses Act 1854 c 38
 Gold and Silver Wares Act 1854 c 96
 Government of India Act 1854 c 77
 Heritable Securities (Scotland) Act 1854 c 62
 Highway Rates Act 1854 c 52
 Highways, South Wales Act 1854 c 7
 Holyhead Harbours Act 1854 c 44
 Inclosure Act 1854 c 97
 Income Tax Act 1854 c 10
 Income Tax Act 1854 c 24
 Income Tax Act 1854 c 40
 Indemnity Act 1854 c 39
 Industrial and Provident Societies Act 1854 c 25
 Jamaica Loan Act 1854 c 54
 Jury Trials (Scotland) Act 1854 c 59
 Land, Assessed, and Income Taxes Act 1854 c 85
 Lands Valuation (Scotland) Act 1854 c 91
 Linen, etc., Manufacturers (Ireland) Act 1854 c 46
 Literary and Scientific Institutions Act 1854 c 112
 Local Boards Highway Repair Indemnity Act 1854 c 69. Sometimes called the Highways Act 1854.
 Manchester Division Stipendiary Justice Act 1854 c 20. Sometimes called the Stipendiary Magistrate, Manchester and Salford Act 1854.
 Marine Mutiny Act 1854 c 6
 Marylebone Chapels Act 1854 c 70
 Merchant Shipping Act 1854 c 104
 Merchant Shipping Repeal Act 1854 c 120
 Metropolitan Sewers Act 1854 c 111
 Midland Great Western Railway Act 1854 c 124
 Militia Act 1854 c 13
 Militia (Ireland) Act 1854 c 107
 Militia (Scotland) Act 1854 c 106
 Militia Ballots Suspension Act 1854 c 108
 Militia Law Amendment Act 1854 c 105
 Militia Pay Act 1854 c 109
 Mutiny Act 1854 c 4
 National Gallery of Ireland Act 1854 c 99
 Naval Pay and Prize Act 1854 c 19. Also called the Navy Pay and Prize Act 1854. The Bill for this Act was the Navy Pay Bill or the Navy Pay, etc., Bill
 New Forest Act 1854 c 49
 Oxford University Act 1854 c 81
 Parochial Schoolmaster (Scotland) Act 1854 c 98
 Poor Law Board Act 1854 c 41
 Poor Law Board (Ireland) Act 1854 c 63
 Poor Law Union Charges Act 1854 c 43
 Poor Rates Act 1854 c 66
 Port of Dublin Act 1854 c 22
 Prize Act, Russia, 1854 c 18
 Provisional Order Confirmation (Turnpikes) Act 1854 c 51
 Public Health Act 1854 c 95
 Public Health Supplemental Act 1854 c 53
 Public Libraries Act (Scotland) 1854 c 64. Sometimes called the Public Libraries (Scotland) Act 1854.
 Public Revenue and Consolidated Fund Charges Act 1854 c 94
 Public Statues (Metropolis) Act 1854 c 33
 Railway and Canal Traffic Act 1854 c 31
 Real Estate Charges Act 1854 c 113
 Reformatory Schools (Scotland) Act 1854 c 74
 Registration of Births, Deaths, and Marriages (Scotland) Act 1854 c 80
 Removal of Prisoners in Custody Act 1854 c 115
 Returning Officers Act 1854 c 57
 Royal Military Asylum, Chelsea Act 1854 c 61
 Russian Government Securities Act 1854 c 123
 Sale of Beer, etc. Act 1854 c 79
 Savings Banks and Friendly Societies Act 1854 c 50
 Second Annual Inclosure Act 1854 c 48
 Sheriff and Sheriff Clerk of Chancery (Scotland) Act 1854 c 72
 Spirits (Ireland) Act 1854 c 89
 Stamp Act 1854 c 83
 Sugar Duties Act 1854 c 30
 Supply Act 1854 c 2
 Supply Act 1854 c 21
 Towns Improvement (Ireland) Act 1854 c 103
 Treason (Ireland) Act 1854 c 26
 Tunnel between Devonport and Keyham Act 1854 c 15
 Turnpike Acts (Ireland) Act 1854 c 42
 University of London Medical Graduates Act 1854 c 114
 Usury Laws Repeal Act 1854 c 90 (An Act to repeal the Laws relating to Usury, and to the Enrolment of Annuities)
 Validity of Certain Proceedings, etc. Act 1854 c 37
 Valuation (Ireland) Act 1854 c 8
 Warwick Assizes Act 1854 c 35
 West Indian Incumbered Estates Act 1854 c 117
 Youthful Offenders, Great Britain Act 1854 c 86

Local Acts
Birmingham and Midland Institute c.xci

1855 (18 & 19 Vict.)
 Affirmations (Scotland) Act 1855 c 25
 Annual Inclosure Act 1855 c 14. Sometimes called the Inclosures Act 1855.
 Annual Turnpike Acts Continuance Act 1855 c 98. Sometimes called the Turnpike Acts, Great Britain Act 1855.
 Annuity (Lord and Lady Raglan) Act 1855 c 64
 Appropriation Act 1855 c 129
 Army Enlistment Act 1855 c 4
 Australian Waste Lands Act 1855 c 56
 Bills of Lading Act 1855 c 111
 Burial Act 1855 c 128
 Burial Grounds (Scotland) Act 1855 c 68
 Charitable Trusts Amendment Act 1855 c 124
 Chinese Passengers Act 1855 c 104
 Cinque Ports Act 1855 c 48
 Coal Mines Act 1855 c 108
 Commissioners for Oaths Act 1855 c 42
 Commissions of Assize in County Palatine of Lancaster Act 1855 c 45
 Common Law Procedure (Ireland) Act 1855 c 7
 Confirmation of Marriages Act 1855 c 66
 Convention with United States Act 1855 c 77
 Copyhold, etc., Commission Act 1855 c 52
 Court of Chancery Act 1855 c 134
 Court of Exchequer (Ireland) Act 1855 c 50
 Courts in Prince of Wales Island and India Act 1855 c 93
 Crimes and Outrage (Ireland) Act 1855 c 112
 Criminal Justice Act 1855 c 126
 Crown Lands Act 1855 c 16
 Crown Suits Act 1855 c 90
 Customs Duties Act 1855 c 21. Sometimes called the Customs Act 1855.
 Customs Tariff Act 1855 c 97
 Deputy Speaker Act 1855 c 84
 Diseases Prevention Act 1855 c 116
 Downing Street Public Offices Extension Act 1855 c 95
 Drainage and Improvement of Lands (Ireland) Act 1855 c 110
 Dublin Amended Carriage Act 1855 c 65
 Dublin and other Roads Turnpikes Abolition Act 1855 c 69
 Duchy of Lancaster Lands Act 1855 c 58
 Dwelling Houses (Scotland) Act 1855 c 88. Sometimes called the Dwelling Houses for the Working Classes (Scotland) Act 1855.
 Ecclesiastical Courts Act 1855 c 41
 Ecclesiastical Jurisdiction Act 1855 c 75
 Ecclesiastical Property (Ireland) Act 1855 c 28
 Education of Pauper Children Act 1855 c 34
 Endowed Schools Inquiries (Ireland) Act 1855 c 59
 Enlistment of Foreigners Act 1855 c 2
 Exchequer Bills Act 1855 c 8
 Exchequer Bills and Bonds Act 1855 c 130
 Excise Act 1855 c 94
 Excise Duties Act 1855 c 22
 Fishery Convention with France Act 1855 c 101
 Fishery Treaty with United States Act 1855 c 3
 Forms of Pleading in High Court Act 1855 c 26
 Friendly Societies Act 1855 c 63
 General Board of Health Continuance Act 1855 c 115. Sometimes called the General Board of Health Continued Act 1855.
 Haileybury College Act 1855 c 53
 House of Commons Act 1855 c 10
 Huddersfield Burial Ground Act 1855 c 89
 Income Tax Act 1855 c 20
 Income Tax (Insurance) Act 1855 c 35
 Incorporation of Brighton Act 1855 c 31
 Incumbered Estates (Ireland) Act 1855 c 73
 Indemnity Act 1855 c 49
 Infant Settlements Act 1855 c 43
 Inland Revenue Act 1855 c 78
 Intestate Moveable Succession (Scotland) Act 1855 c 23
 Intoxicating Liquors Act 1855 c 118
 Inverness Bridge (Treasury Grant) Act 1855 c 113
 Island of Tobago Loan Act 1855 c 107
 Judgments Act 1855 c 15
 Labourers Dwellings Act 1855 c 132
 Leasing Powers Act for Religious Worship in (Ireland) 1855 or the Leasing Powers for Religious Worship in (Ireland) Act 1855 c 39
 Liberty of Religious Worship Act 1855 c 86
 Licensing (Ireland) Act 1855 c 62
 Limited Liability Act 1855 c 133
 Lunacy Act 1855 c 13
 Lunacy Regulation Act 1855 c 105
 Lunatic Asylums Repayment of Advances (Ireland) Act 1855 c 109
 Marine Mutiny Act 1855 c 12
 Merchant Shipping Act Amendment Act 1855 c 91. Also called the Merchant Shipping Amendment Act 1855.
 Metropolis Management Act 1855 c 120
 Metropolitan Building Act 1855 c 122
 Metropolitan Sewers Act 1855 c 30
 Militia Act 1855 c 1
 Militia Act 1855 c 57
 Militia Ballot System Act 1855 c 106
 Militia (Ireland) Act 1855 c 19
 Militia Pay Act 1855 c 123
 Mutiny Act 1855 c 11
 National Debt Act 1855 c 18
 National Gallery of Ireland Act 1855 c 44
 National Museum of Industry for Scotland and General Register House Act 1855 c 80
 New South Wales Constitution Act 1855 c 54
 Newspapers Act 1855 c 27
 Nuisances Removal Act for England 1855 c 121. Sometimes called the Nuisances Removal (England) Act 1855.
 Officers of the Militia Act 1855 c 100
 Ordnance Board Transfer Act 1855 c 117
 Oxford University Act 1855 c 36
 Parliamentary Elections (Scotland) Act 1855 c 24
 Passengers Act 1855 c 119
 Places of Worship Registration Act 1855 c 81
 Poor (Burials) Act 1855 c 79
 Poor Law Union Charges Act 1855 c 47
 Poor Rates Act 1855 c 51
 Private Lunatic Asylums (Ireland) Act 1855 c 76
 Provisional Order Confirmation (Turnpikes) Act 1855 c 102
 Public Health Supplemental Act 1855 c 125
 Public House (Ireland) Act 1855 c 114. Sometimes called the Public Houses (Ireland) Act 1855.
 Public Libraries Act 1855 c 70
 Public Libraries Act (Ireland) 1855 or the Public Libraries (Ireland) Act 1855
 Rectory of Ledbury Act 1855 c 92
 Registration of Births, Deaths, and Marriages (Scotland) Act 1855 c 29
 Sardinia Loan Act 1855 c 17
 School Grants Act 1855 c 131
 Second Annual Inclosure Act 1855 c 61. Sometimes called the Inclosure Act 1855 No. 2 or the Commons Inclosure (No. 2) Act. 
 Slave Trade Suppression, African Treaty Act 1855 c 85
 Spirit of Wine Act 1855 c 38
 Spirits (Ireland) Act 1855 c 103
 Stannaries Act 1855 c 32
 Summary Procedure on Bills of Exchange Act 1855 c 67
 Supplemental Customs Consolidation Act 1855 c 96. Sometimes called the Supplemental Customs Act 1855.
 Supply Act 1855 c 5
 Supply Act 1855 c 6
 Supply Act 1855 c 37
 Tea Duties Decline Suspension Act 1855 c 9. Sometimes called the Tea Duties Act 1855.
 Treasurers of Counties (Ireland) Act 1855 c 74
 Trinity College, Dublin Act 1855 c 82
 Turkish Loan Act 1855 c 99
 Turnpike Acts (Ireland) Act 1855 c 83
 Union of Benefices, etc. Act 1855 c 127
 Validity of Proceedings in the House of Commons Act 1855 c 33
 Victoria Constitution Act 1855 c 55
 Wedding Rings Act 1855 c 60
 Weights and Measures Act 1855 c 72
 West India Loans Act 1855 c 71
 Woolmer Forest Act 1855 c 46
 Youthful Offenders Act 1855 c 87

1856 (19 & 20 Vict.)
Session of the 16th Parliament of Queen Victoria, from 31 January 1856 until 29 July 7 1856.

See

Public acts

| {{|Metropolitan Police Act 1856|public|2|28-02-1856|repealed=n|maintained=y|archived=n|An Act to amend the Acts relating to the Metropolitan Police.}}

| {{|Joint Stock Banks (Scotland) Act 1856|note1=|public|3|31-01-1856|note3=|repealed=y|maintained=n|archived=n|}}

| {{|Supply Act 1856|public|4|31-01-1856|note3=|repealed=y|maintained=n|archived=n|}}

| {{|National Debt Act 1856|public|5|31-01-1856|note3=|repealed=y|maintained=n|archived=n|}}

| {{|National Debt Act 1856|public|6|31-01-1856|note3=|repealed=y|maintained=n|archived=n|}}

| {{|Supply Act 1856|public|7|31-01-1856|note3=|repealed=y|maintained=n|archived=n|}}

| {{|Marine Mutiny Act 1856|public|8|31-01-1856|note3=|repealed=y|archived=n|}}

| {{|Public Money Drainage Act 1856|note1=|public|9|31-01-1856|note3=|repealed=y|archived=n|}}

| {{|Mutiny Act 1856|public|10|31-01-1856|note3=|repealed=y|archived=n|An Act for punishing Mutiny and Desertion, and for the better Payment of the Army and their Quarters.}}

| {{|Annual Inclosure Act 1856|note1=|public|11|31-01-1856|note3=|repealed=y|archived=n|}}

| {{|Turnpike Trusts Act 1856|public|12|31-01-1856|note3=|repealed=y|archived=n|An Act to confirm certain Provisional Orders made under an Act of the Fifteenth Year of Her present Majesty, to facilitate Arrangements for the Relief of Turnpike Trusts.}}

| {{|Delamere Forest Act 1856|public|13|31-01-1856|note3=|repealed=y|archived=n|An Act  to  make  Provision for the Management of certain Lands belonging to Her Majesty within the former Limits of the late Forest of Delamere in the County of Chester.}}

| {{|Poor Law Commissioners (Ireland) Act 1856|public|14|31-01-1856|note3=|repealed=y|archived=n|}}

| {{|Out-pensioners of Greenwich and Chelsea Hospitals Act 1856|public|15|31-01-1856|note3=|repealed=y|archived=n|}}

| {{|Central Criminal Court Act 1856|public|16|11-04-1856|repealed=y|archived=n|An Act to empower the Court of Queen's Bench to order certain Offenders to be tried at the Central Criminal Court.}}

| {{|Public Works Act 1856|public|17|31-01-1856|note3=|repealed=y|archived=n|}}

| {{|Public Works (Ireland) Act 1856|note1=|public|18|31-01-1856|note3=|repealed=y|archived=n|}}

| {{|Exchequer Bills Act 1856|public|19|31-01-1856|note3=|repealed=y|archived=n|}}

| {{|Bankers' Compositions Act 1856|note1=Sometimes called the Bankers' Composition Act 1856.|public|20|31-01-1856|note3=|repealed=y|archived=n|}}

| {{|National Debt Act 1856|public|21|31-01-1856|note3=|repealed=y|archived=n|}}

| {{|Stamps Act 1856|public|22|31-01-1856|note3=|repealed=y|archived=n|}}

| {{|Canada Company's Amendment Act 1856|note1=|public|23|31-01-1856|note3=|repealed=y|archived=n|An Act for granting certain additional Powers and Authorities to the Canada Company.}}

| {{|Juvenile Convict Prisons Act 1856|note1= Sometimes called the Juvenile Convict Prison (Ireland) Act 1856.|public|24|31-01-1856|note3=|repealed=y|archived=n|}}

| {{|Drafts on Bankers Act 1856|public|25|31-01-1856|note3=|repealed=y|archived=n|}}

| {{|Public Health Supplemental Act 1856|note1=|public|26|31-01-1856|note3=|repealed=y|archived=n|}}

| {{|Pawnbrokers Act 1856|public|27|31-01-1856|note3=|repealed=y|archived=n|}}

| {{|Reformatory Schools (Scotland) Act 1856|note1=|public|28|31-01-1856|note3=|repealed=y|archived=n|}}

| {{|National Gallery Act 1856|public|29|23-06-1856|repealed=y|maintained=y|archived=n|An Act to extend the Powers of the Trustees and Director of the National Gallery, and to authorize the Sale of Works of Art belonging to the Public.|note4= }}

| {{|Annuity to Sir W. F. Williams Act 1856|public|30|31-01-1856|note3=|repealed=y|archived=n|}}

| {{|Oxford University Act 1856|public|31|31-01-1856|note3=|repealed=y|archived=n|}}

| {{|Whichwood Disafforesting Amendment Act 1856|note1=Sometimes called the Whichwood Disafforesting Act 1856.|public|32|31-01-1856|note3=|repealed=y|archived=n|An Act to amend the Whichwood Disafforesting Act, 1853.}}

| {{|Income Tax Act 1856|public|33|31-01-1856|note3=|repealed=y|archived=n|}}

| {{|Excise Duties Act 1856|public|34|31-01-1856|note3=|repealed=y|archived=n|}}

| {{|West India Relief Commissioners Act 1856|public|35|31-01-1856|note3=|repealed=y|archived=n|}}

| {{|Peace Preservation, Ireland, Act 1856|note1=|public|36|31-01-1856|note3=|repealed=y|archived=n|}}

| {{|Transfer of Works (Ireland) Act 1856|note1=|public|37|31-01-1856|note3=|repealed=y|archived=n|}}

| {{|Factory Act 1856|note1=|public|38|31-01-1856|note3=|repealed=y|archived=n|An Act for the further Amendment of the Laws relating to Labour in Factories.}}

| {{|Sardinian Loan Act 1856|note1=|public|39|31-01-1856|note3=|repealed=y|archived=n|}}

| {{|Industrial and Provident Societies Act 1856|public|40|31-01-1856|note3=|repealed=y|archived=n|}}

| {{|Seamen's Savings Bank Act 1856|public|41|31-01-1856|note3=|repealed=y|archived=n|}}

| {{|Poor Rates Act 1856|public|42|31-01-1856|note3=|repealed=y|archived=n|}}

| {{|St. Mary Magdalen Hospital, Bath Act 1856|public|45|31-01-1856|note3=|repealed=y|archived=n|}}

| {{|Hereditary Revenues Act 1856|public|43|31-01-1856|note3=|repealed=y|archived=n|An Act to authorise issues out of the Consolidated Fund for the redemption of certain Annuities charged on branches of the gross revenue.}}

| {{|Exchequer Bills and Bonds Act 1856|public|44|31-01-1856|note3=|repealed=y|archived=n|}}

| {{|Imprisonment (Scotland) Act 1856|note1=|public|46|31-01-1856|note3=|repealed=y|archived=n|}}

| {{|Joint Stock Companies Act 1856|public|47|31-01-1856|note3=|repealed=y|archived=n|An Act for the Incorporation and Regulation of Joint Stock Companies and other Associations.}}

| {{|Justices (Scotland) Act 1856|note1=|public|48|31-01-1856|note3=|repealed=y|archived=n|}}

| {{|Annual Turnpike Acts Continuance Act 1856|note1=Sometimes called the Turnpike Acts, Great Britain Act 1856.|public|49|31-01-1856|note3=|repealed=y|archived=n|}}

| {{|Sale of Advowsons Act 1856|note1=|public|50|31-01-1856|note3=|repealed=y|archived=n|}}

| {{|Use of Rice in Distillation Act 1856|public|51|31-01-1856|note3=|repealed=y|archived=n|}}

| {{|Militia Ballots Suspension Act 1856|public|52|31-01-1856|note3=|repealed=y|archived=n|}}

| {{|Moulton Endowed School Act 1856|public|53|31-01-1856|note3=|repealed=y|archived=n|}}

| {{|Grand Juries Act 1856|note1=|public|54|31-01-1856|note3=|repealed=y|archived=n|}}

| {{|Exchequer Court (Scotland) Act 1856|note1=|public|56|21-07-1856|repealed=n|maintained=y|archived=n|An Act to constitute the Court of Session the Court of Exchequer in Scotland, and to regulate Procedure in Matters connected with the Exchequer.}}

| {{|Church Building Commissioners (Transfer of Powers) Act 1856|note1=|public|55|31-01-1856|note3=|repealed=y|archived=n|}}

| {{|Manor Court of St. Sepulchre Abolition Act 1856|note1=|public|57|31-01-1856|note3=|repealed=y|archived=n|}}

| {{|Burgh Voters Registration (Scotland) Act 1856|note1=|public|58|31-01-1856|note3=|repealed=y|archived=n|}}

| {{|Revenue (Transfer of Charges) Act 1856|note1=|public|59|31-01-1856|note3=|repealed=y|archived=n|}}

| {{|Mercantile Law Amendment Act (Scotland) 1856|note1=or the Mercantile Law Amendment Act Scotland 1856|public|60|21-07-1856|repealed=n|maintained=y|archived=n|An Act to amend the Laws of Scotland affecting Trade and Commerce.}}

| {{|Survey Act 1856|public|61|31-01-1856|note3=|repealed=y|archived=n|}}

| {{|Drainage (Ireland) Act 1856|note1=|public|62|31-01-1856|note3=|repealed=y|archived=n|}}

| {{|Grand Jury (Ireland) Act 1856|note1=|public|63|31-01-1856|note3=|repealed=y|archived=n|}}

| {{|Repeal of Obsolete Statutes Act 1856|public|64|31-01-1856|note3=|repealed=y|archived=n|An Act to repeal certain Statutes which are not in use.}}

| {{|Cottier Tenant (Ireland) Act 1856|note1=|public|65|31-01-1856|note3=|repealed=y|archived=n|}}

| {{|Rights of Way Near Aldershot Camp Act 1856|public|66|31-01-1856|note3=|repealed=y|archived=n|}}

| {{|Incumbered Estates (Ireland) Act 1856|public|67|31-01-1856|note3=|repealed=y|archived=n|}}

| {{|Prisons (Ireland) Act 1856|note1=|public|68|31-01-1856|note3=|repealed=y|archived=n|}}

| {{|County and Borough Police Act 1856|public|69|31-01-1856|note3=|repealed=y|archived=n|An Act to render more effectual the Police in Counties and Boroughs in England and Wales.}}

| {{|Confirmation of Marriages Act 1856|public|70|31-01-1856|note3=|repealed=y|archived=n|}}

| {{|Annual Turnpike Acts (Ireland) Continuance Act 1856|note1=|public|71|31-01-1856|note3=|repealed=y|archived=n|}}

| {{|Railways (Ireland) Act 1856|public|72|31-01-1856|note3=|repealed=y|archived=n|}}

| {{|Indemnity Act 1856|public|73|31-01-1856|note3=|repealed=y|archived=n|}}

| {{|Episcopal, etc., Estates Management Act 1856|public|74|31-01-1856|note3=|repealed=y|archived=n|}}

| {{|Customs Act 1856|public|75|31-01-1856|note3=|repealed=y|archived=n|}}

| {{|Roman Catholic Charities Act 1856|public|76|31-01-1856|note3=|repealed=y|archived=n|}}

| {{|Chancery Receivers (Ireland) Act 1856|note1=|public|77|31-01-1856|note3=|repealed=y|archived=n|}}

| {{|Unlawful Oaths (Ireland) Act 1856|public|78|31-01-1856|note3=|repealed=y|archived=n|}}

| {{|Bankruptcy (Scotland) Act 1856|note1=|public|79|31-01-1856|note3=|repealed=y|archived=n|}}

| {{|Taxes Act 1856|note1=|public|80|31-01-1856|note3=|repealed=y|archived=n|}}

| {{|Stamps Act 1856|public|81|31-01-1856|note3=|repealed=y|archived=n|}}

| {{|Duty on Racehorses Act 1856|public|82|31-01-1856|note3=|repealed=y|archived=n|}}

| {{|Coast-guard Service Act 1856|note1=Sometimes called the Coastguard Service Act 1856.|public|83|31-01-1856|note3=|repealed=y|archived=n|}}

| {{|Corrupt Practices Act 1856|public|84|31-01-1856|note3=|repealed=y|archived=n|}}

| {{|General Board of Health Act 1856|public|85|31-01-1856|note3=|repealed=y|archived=n|}}

| {{|Cursitor Baron of the Exchequer Act 1856|public|86|31-01-1856|note3=|repealed=y|archived=n|}}

| {{|Lunatic Asylums Act 1856|public|87|31-01-1856|note3=|repealed=y|archived=n|}}

| {{|Cambridge University Act 1856|public|88|20-07-1856|repealed=n|maintained=y|archived=n|An Act to make further Provision for the good Government and Extension of the University of Cambridge, of the Colleges therein, and of the College of King Henry the Sixth at Eton.}}

| {{|Form of Deeds (Scotland) Act 1856|public|89|31-01-1856|note3=|repealed=y|archived=n|}}

| {{|Militia Pay Act 1856|public|90|31-01-1856|note3=|repealed=y|archived=n|}}

| {{|Debts Securities (Scotland) Act 1856|note1=|public|91|29-07-1856|repealed=n|maintained=y|archived=n|An Act to amend and re-enact certain Provisions of an Act of the Fifty-fourth Year of King George the Third, relating to Judicial Procedure and Securities for Debts in Scotland.}}

| {{|Chancery Appeal Court (Ireland) Act 1856|note1=|public|92|31-01-1856|note3=|repealed=y|archived=n|}}

| {{|Commissioners of Supply (Scotland) Act 1856|note1=|public|93|31-01-1856|note3=|repealed=y|archived=n|}}

| {{|Administration of Intestates' Estates Act 1856|public|94|31-01-1856|note3=|repealed=y|archived=n|}}

| {{|Oxford Colleges, etc., Estates Act 1856|public|95|31-01-1856|note3=|repealed=y|archived=n|}}

| {{|Marriage (Scotland) Act 1856|note1=|public|96|31-01-1856|note3=|repealed=y|archived=n|}}

| {{|Mercantile Law Amendment Act 1856|note1=|public|97|29-07-1856|repealed=n|maintained=y|archived=n|An Act to amend the Laws of England and Ireland affecting Trade and Commerce.}}

| {{|Burial Grounds (Ireland) Act 1856|note1=|public|98|31-01-1856|note3=|repealed=y|archived=n|}}

| {{|Lunatic Asylums, Superannuations, Ireland, Act 1856|note1=|public|99|31-01-1856|note3=|repealed=y|archived=n|}}

| {{|Joint Stock Banks Act 1856|note1=|public|100|31-01-1856|note3=|repealed=y|archived=n|}}

| {{|Contagious Diseases, Animals Act 1856|public|101|31-01-1856|note3=|repealed=y|archived=n|}}

| {{|Common Law Procedure Amendment Act (Ireland) 1856|note1=Also called the Common Law Procedure Amendment (Ireland) Act 1856.|public|102|31-01-1856|note3=|repealed=y|archived=n|}}

| {{|Nuisances Removal (Scotland) Act 1856|note1=|public|103|31-01-1856|note3=|repealed=y|archived=n|}}

| {{|New Parishes Act 1856|note1=|public|104|31-01-1856|note3=|repealed=y|archived=n|}}

| {{|Appropriation Act 1856|public|105|31-01-1856|note3=|repealed=y|archived=n|}}

| {{|Second Annual Inclosure Act 1856|note1=|public|106|31-01-1856|note3=|repealed=y|archived=n|}}

| {{|Smoke Abatement, London Act 1856|public|107|31-01-1856|note3=|repealed=y|archived=n|}}

| {{|County Courts Act 1856|note1=|public|108|31-01-1856|note3=|repealed=y|archived=n|}}

| {{|Reformatory, etc., Schools Act 1856|public|109|31-01-1856|note3=|repealed=y|archived=n|}}

| {{|Dublin Hospitals Regulation Act 1856|note1=Sometimes called the Dublin Hospitals Act 1856.|public|110|31-01-1856|note3=|repealed=y|archived=n|}}

| {{|Stoke Poges Hospital Act 1856|public|111|31-01-1856|note3=|repealed=y|archived=n|}}

| {{|Metropolis Management Amendment Act 1856|note1=|public|112|31-01-1856|note3=|repealed=y|archived=n|}}

| {{|Foreign Tribunals Evidence Act 1856|note1=|public|113|31-01-1856|note3=|repealed=y|archived=n|}}

| {{|Hay and Straw Act 1856|note1=|public|114|31-01-1856|note3=|repealed=y|archived=n|}}

| {{|Bishops of London and Durham Act 1856|public|115|31-01-1856|note3=|repealed=y|archived=n|}}

| {{|Education Department Act 1856|note1=|public|116|31-01-1856|note3=|repealed=y|archived=n|}}

| {{|Poor Law (Scotland) Act 1856|note1=|public|117|31-01-1856|note3=|repealed=y|archived=n|}}

| {{|Criminal Justice Act 1856|note1=|public|118|31-01-1856|note3=|repealed=y|archived=n|}}

| {{|Marriage and Registration Act 1856|note1=|public|119|29-07-1856|repealed=y|maintained=y|archived=n|An Act to amend the Provisions of the Marriage and Registration Acts.|note4= }}

| {{|Settled Estates Act 1856|public|120|29-07-1856|repealed=n|maintained=y|archived=n|An Act to facilitate Leases and Sales of Settled Estates.}}
}}

Private and personal acts

| {{|Thornhill's Estate Act 1856|private|2|23-06-1856|repealed=n|archived=n|An Act for continuing in force, during the Minority of Mrs. Clara Clarke Thornhill, the Wife of William Capel Clarke Thornhill, of Swakeleys in the County of Middlesex, Esquire, the Powers conferred by "Thornhill's Estate Act, 1854," and for other Purposes.}}

| {{|Wainman's Estate Act 1856|private|3|23-06-1856|repealed=n|archived=n|An Act for authorizing the Trustees under the Will of William Wainman Esquire, deceased, to grant Leases, and to make Sales, Exchanges, and Partition of the Real Estates devised by or subject to the Trusts of the same Will; and for other purposes.}}

| {{|The Blenheim Estate Act 1856|private|4|23-06-1856|repealed=n|archived=n|An Act for giving effect to a Compromise relating to the Estate of the Most Noble George Fourth Duke of Marlborough, deceased, and, with a view thereto, for extinguishing the demisable Quality of certain Copyhold Hereditaments, Parcels of the Manors comprised in the Estates and Hereditmanents settled on the Dukedom, and for creating a Term of Years in a Portion of the said Copyhold Hereditaments.}}

| {{|Sir Lionel Milborne Swinnerton: Change of Name to Milborne Swinnerton Pilkington Act 1856|private|5|23-06-1856|repealed=n|archived=n|An Act to authorize Sir Lionel Milborne Swinnerton Baronet and his Issue to assume and bear the Surnam of Pilkington jointly with the Surnames of Milborne and Swinnerton, and to be called by the Surnames of Milborne Swinnerton Pilkington.}}

| {{|Ingham's Estate Act 1856|private|6|30-06-1856|repealed=n|archived=n|An Act for vesting in Trustees the undivided Parts, subject to the Limitations of the Wills of Benjamin Inham deceased and Joshua Ingham deceased respectively, of Estates in the West Riding of the County of York, and for authorizing Partitions of Parts of those Estates, and for authorizing Leases and Sales of Parts of those Estates, and for other Purposes.}}

| {{|Dawson's Estate Act 1856|private|7|30-06-1856|repealed=n|archived=n|An Act to authorize the granting of Leases of Parts of the Freehold, Copyhold, and Leasehold Estates of the late Leonard Lewen Wheatley Esquire, situate in the several Parishes of Saint Lawrence and Saint Peter the Apostle in the Isle of Thanet, of Meopham near Gravesend, and Ash next Sandwich, and elsewhere in the County of Kent, and within the Manor of Stepney otherwise Stebunheath Ratcliffe in the Parish of Saint Dunstan Stepney, and elsewhere in the County of Middlesex.}}

| {{|Butterwick's Estate Act 1856|private|8|14-07-1856|repealed=n|archived=n|An Act to enable the Trustees of the Will of Matthew Butterwick Esquire to sell the Rectory and Tithes of Thirsk, held by Lease for Lives under the Archbishop of York, and certain Policies of Assurance, and for the Investment of the Proceeds, and for other Purposes; of which the Short Title is "Butterwick's Estate Act, 1856."}}

| {{|Walmesley's Estate Act 1856|private|9|21-07-1856|repealed=n|archived=n|An Act for enabling Leases for Mining, Agricultural, and Building Purposes to be made of the Estates of John Walmesley Esquire, deceased, and Sales of Portions thereof, and for other Purposes, the Short Title of which is "Walmesley's Estate Act, 1856."}}

| {{|The Thoroton and Croft Estate Act 1856|note1=|private|10|29-07-1856|repealed=n|archived=n|An Act for enabling Leases and Sales to be made of Lands and hereditaments in the Counties of Northumberland and Durham belonging to the Families of Thoroton and Croft, and for other Purposes, called "The Thoroton and Croft Estate Act, 1856."}}

| {{|Dallington Estate Act 1856|private|11|29-07-1856|repealed=n|archived=n|An Act for vesting in Trustees the Estates of the late Sarah Reddall deceased, situate in the County of Northampton, known as the Dallington Estate, for the Purpose of enabling Leases, Sales, Exchanges, and Partitions to be made of the same; and for other Purposes.}}

| {{|Bell's Estate Act 1856|private|12|29-07-1856|repealed=n|archived=n|An Act to enable the Trustees of the Will of John Bell Esquire to sell a Leasehold Estate for Lives in the County of York known as "Wildon Grange," held of the Archbishop of York, and for the Reinvestment of the Proceeds in the Purchase of Real Estates of Inheritence, of which the Short Title is "Bell's Estate Act, 1856."}}

| {{|The Cairness Estate Amendment Act 1856|private|13|29-07-1856|repealed=n|archived=n|An Act to amend and enlarge the Powers of an Act passed in the Twelth and Thirteenth Years of the Reign of Her present Majesty Queen Victoria, intituled An Act for authorizing the Trustees of the late Thomas Gordon to sell his Estates of Cairness and others in the County of Aberdeen, and to apply the Prtice thereof in Payment of the Debts and Burdens affecting the same; and for laying out the Residue of the Price in the Purchase of other Lands, to be entailed in Terms of the Trust Deed of Settlement by the said Thomas Gordon; and for other Purposes.}}

| {{|Brydges' Estate Act 1856|private|14|29-07-1856|repealed=n|archived=n|An Act for enabling Partitions, Sales, Exchanges, and Leases to be made of certain Parts of the Estates devised by the Will of Sir John William Head Brydges deceased, and for other Purposes.}}

| {{|Enabling George Shipton to exercise the office of a priest and hold any benefice or preferment in the Church of England and Ireland.|private|15|31-01-1856|note3=|repealed=n|archived=n|}}

| {{|John Talbot's divorce from Marianne Talbot, and other provisions.|private|16|31-01-1856|note3=|repealed=n|archived=n|}}

| {{|Madgwick Davidson's divorce from Katherine Davidson, and other provisions.|private|17|31-01-1856|note3=|repealed=n|archived=n|}}
}}

Local acts

| {{|Knottingley Gas Act 1856|local|2|31-01-1856|note3=|repealed=y|maintained=y|archived=n|An Act for supplying with Gas the Townships of Knottingley and Ferrybridge in the West Hiding of the County of York.}}

| {{|Colonial Bank Act 1856|local|3|31-01-1856|note3=|repealed=y|maintained=y|archived=n|An Act to extend the Period limited for the Exercise of the Powers of the Colonial Bank; and for other Purposes.}}

| {{|Weymouth Gas Act 1856|local|4|31-01-1856|note3=|repealed=n|maintained=y|archived=n|An Act for lighting with Gas the Borough of Weymouth and Melcombe Regis, and its Neighbourhood, in the County of Dorset; and for other Purposes. }}

| {{|Chorley Waterworks Transfer Act 1856|local|5|31-01-1856|note3=|repealed=y|maintained=y|archived=n|An Act for vesting in the Mayor, Aldermen, and Burgesses of the Borough of Liverpool the Undertaking of the Chorley Waterworks Company, and for other Purposes.}}

| {{|Lancaster Gas Company's Act 1856|local|6|31-01-1856|note3=|repealed=y|maintained=y|archived=n|An Act for incorporating the Lancaster Gaslight Company, and extending their Powers, and for authorizing additional Works, and the raising of further Monies; and for other Purposes.}}

| {{|Haslingden and Rawtenstall Waterworks Act 1856|local|7|31-01-1856|note3=|repealed=|maintained=y|archived=n|An Act to enable the Haslingden and Rawtenstall Waterworks Company to raise a further Sum of Money, and for other Purposes.|note4= }}

| {{|Southport Waterworks Act 1856|local|8|31-01-1856|note3=|repealed=n|maintained=y|archived=n|An Act to enable the Southport Waterworks Company to raise a further Sum of Money, and for other Purposes.}}

| {{|Gainsborough Gas Act 1856|local|9|31-01-1856|note3=|repealed=y|maintained=y|archived=n|An Act for the better supplying with Gas the Parish of Gainsborough in Lincolnshire.}}

| {{|Lambeth Waterworks Act 1856|local|10|31-01-1856|note3=|repealed=n|maintained=y|archived=n|An Act for enabling the Company of Proprietors of Lambeth Waterworks to raise further Money, and for other Purposes.}}

| {{|Dundee Harbour Act 1856|local|11|31-01-1856|note3=|repealed=y|maintained=y|archived=n|An Act for effecting certain Alterations in the Works of the Tidal Harbour of Victoria Dock at Dundee, and for other Purposes in relation to the Harbour of Dundee.}}

| {{|Lincoln Waterworks Act 1856|local|12|31-01-1856|note3=|repealed=n|maintained=y|archived=n|An Act to enable the Lincoln Waterworks Company to raise a further Sum of Money.}}

| {{|Heywood Gas Amendment Act 1856|local|13|31-01-1856|note3=|repealed=n|maintained=y|archived=n|An Act for granting further Powers to the Heywood Gaslight and Coke Company.}}

| {{|Milford Railway Act 1856|local|14|31-01-1856|note3=|repealed=n|maintained=y|archived=n|An Act for the incorporating of the Milford Railway Company and for the making of the Milford Railway in the County of Pembroke.}}

| {{|London, Tilbury and Southend Railway Amendment Act 1856|local|15|31-01-1856|note3=|repealed=n|maintained=y|archived=n|An Act to enable the Eastern Counties and London and Blackball Railway Companies to raise a further Sum of Money for the Purposes of the London, Tilbury, and Southend Extension Railway; to amend the Acts relating to such Undertaking; and for other Purposes.}}

| {{|East Somerset Railway Act 1856|local|16|31-01-1856|note3=|repealed=n|maintained=y|archived=n|An Act for making a Railway from the Wilts, Somerset, and Weymouth Railway, near Frome, to Shepton Mallett in the County of Somerset.}}

| {{|Cambridge Award Act 1856|note1=|local|17|05-06-1856|repealed=n|maintained=y|archived=n|An Act to confirm an Award for the Settlement of Matters in difference between the University and Borough of Cambridge, and for other Purposes connected therewith.}}

| {{|Ulster, Portadown and Dungannon Railways Act 1856|local|18|31-01-1856|note3=|repealed=n|maintained=y|archived=n|An Act to enable the Ulster Railway Company to subscribe towards the Undertaking of the Portadown and Dungannon Railway Company, and to authorize certain Arrangements between the said Companies, and for other Purposes.}}

| {{|Filey Waterworks Act 1856|local|19|31-01-1856|note3=|repealed=y|maintained=y|archived=n|An Act for supplying with Water the Town of Filey and the Environs and Neighbourhood thereof, and other Places in the East and North Ridings of the County of York, and for authorizing the Purchase of the Filey Gasworks, and for supplying the said Town with Gas; and for other Purposes.|note4= }}

| {{|Wakefield Gas Act 1856|local|20|31-01-1856|note3=|repealed=y|maintained=y|archived=n|An Act to empower the Wakefield Gaslight Company to raise a further Sum of Money.}}

| {{|Worksop Gas Act 1856|local|21|31-01-1856|note3=|repealed=n|maintained=y|archived=n|An Act for incorporating the Worksop Gas Company.}}

| {{|Llanidloes and Newtown Railway Deviation Act 1856|local|22|31-01-1856|note3=|repealed=n|maintained=y|archived=n|An Act to amend and extend the Provisions of "The Llanidloes and Newtown Railway Act, 1863;" and to enable the Llanidloes and Newtown Railway Company to make certain Deviations in their authorized Line and Levels, and for other Purposes.}}

| {{|Boston Gas Amendment Act 1856|local|23|31-01-1856|note3=|repealed=n|maintained=y|archived=n|An Act to confer further Powers on the Boston Gaslight and Coke Company.}}

| {{|East of Fife Railway (Deviation) Act 1856|local|24|31-01-1856|note3=|repealed=n|maintained=y|archived=n|An Act to enable the East of Fife Railway Company to make a Deviation in the Line of their Railway, and for other Purposes.}}

| {{|Leicester and Welford Road Act 1856|local|25|31-01-1856|note3=|repealed=y|maintained=y|archived=n|An Act for continuing the Term and amending and extending the Provisions of the Act relating to the Leicester and Welford Turnpike Road, in the Counties of Leicester and Northampton.}}

| {{|Gravesend Improvement Act 1856|local|26|31-01-1856|note3=|repealed=y|maintained=y|archived=n|An Act for more effectually paving, cleansing, lighting, and otherwise improving the Town of Gravesend in the County of Kent.|note4= }}

| {{|Scarborough Waterworks Amendment Act 1856|local|27|31-01-1856|note3=|repealed=n|maintained=y|archived=n|An Act to enable the Scarborough Waterworks Company to raise a further Sum of Money, and to extend the Limits for the Supply of Water, and to amend the Provisions of the Act relating to such Company.}}

| {{|Sleaford and Tattershall Road Act 1856|local|28|31-01-1856|note3=|repealed=y|maintained=y|archived=n|An Act to repeal the Acts relating to the Sleaford and Tattershall Turnpike Road, and to make other Provisions in lieu thereof.}}

| {{|Bath Gas Act 1856|local|29|31-01-1856|note3=|repealed=n|maintained=y|archived=n|An Act to confer further Powers on the Bath Gaslight and Coke Company.}}

| {{|Cheltenham Gas Act 1856|local|30|31-01-1856|note3=|repealed=n|maintained=y|archived=n|An Act to confer further Powers on the Cheltenham Gaslight and Coke Company.}}

| {{|Crowland and Eye Turnpike Road Act 1856|local|31|31-01-1856|note3=|repealed=y|maintained=y|archived=n|An Act for continuing the Term and amending the Provisions of the Act for making and maintaining a Turnpike Road from the Town of Crowland in the County of Lincoln to the Town of Eye in the County of Northampton.}}

| {{|Edinburgh Municipality Extension Act 1856|local|32|31-01-1856|note3=|repealed=y|maintained=y|archived=n|An Act to extend the Municipal Boundaries of the City of Edinburgh, to transfer the Powers of the Commissioners of Police to the Magistrates and Council, and for other Purposes relating to the Municipality of the said City.}}

| {{|Cork and Youghal Railway Amendment Act 1856|local|33|31-01-1856|note3=|repealed=n|maintained=y|archived=n|An Act to authorize the Cork and Youghal Railway Company to extend their Railway into Cork, and for other Purposes.}}

| {{|Banbridge Junction Railway Act 1856|local|34|31-01-1856|note3=|repealed=n|maintained=y|archived=n|An Act for altering the Name of the Banbridge, Newry, Dublin, and Belfast Junction Railway Company to the Name "The Banbridge Junction Railway Company," for increasing their Capital and extending their Powers, and for other Purposes.}}

| {{|Glasgow Court Houses Act 1856|local|35|31-01-1856|note3=|repealed=n|maintained=y|archived=n|An Act for enlarging and improving the Justiciary Court House, and Court Houses and Public Buildings of the City of Glasgow and County of Lanark, for erecting additional Buildings, for amending the Act relating thereto, and for other Purposes.}}

| {{|Dewsbury, Batley and Heckmondwike Waterworks Act 1856|local|36|31-01-1856|note3=|repealed=n|maintained=y|archived=n|An Act for making better Provision for supplying the Districts of Dewsbury, Batley, and Heckmondwike with Water, and for confirming an Agreement between the Local Boards of Health of those Districts; and for other Purposes.}}

| {{|Kettering and Newport Pagnell Turnpike Road Act 1856|local|37|31-01-1856|note3=|repealed=y|maintained=y|archived=n|An Act for the Continuance and Regulation of the Kettering and Newport Pagnell Turnpike Road Trust.}}

| {{|Coventry Gas Act 1856|local|38|31-01-1856|note3=|repealed=n|maintained=y|archived=n|An Act to amend the Provisions and extend the Limits of the Act relating to the City of Coventry Gaslight Company.}}

| {{|Stockton and Middlesbrough Road Act 1856|local|39|31-01-1856|note3=|repealed=y|maintained=y|archived=n|An Act to authorize the making of a Turnpike Road from the Township of Thomaby to Middlesbrough in the North Riding of the County of York, with a Bridge over a Creek or Arm of the River Tees, and for other Purposes.}}

| {{|Alford Valley Railway Act 1856|local|40|31-01-1856|note3=|repealed=n|maintained=y|archived=n|An Act to authorize the making of a Railway from the Great North of Scotland Railway to Afford in the County of Aberdeen, to be called "The Alford Valley Railway."}}

| {{|St. Ives and West Cornwall Junction Railway Act 1856|local|41|31-01-1856|note3=|repealed=n|maintained=y|archived=n|An Act to amend "The Saint Ives and West Cornwall Junction Railway Act, 1853."}}

| {{|Shrewsbury Waterworks Act 1856|local|42|31-01-1856|note3=|repealed=n|maintained=y|archived=n|An Act to make further Provision for supplying with Water the Borough of Shrewsbury in the County of Salop.}}

| {{|Barnsdale and Leeds Turnpike Road Act 1856|local|43|31-01-1856|note3=|repealed=y|maintained=y|archived=n|An Act to amend an Act passed in the 7th and 8th Years of the Reign of His late Majesty King George the Fourth, intituled An Act to alter, amend, and enlarge the Powers and Provisions of an Act relating to the Road from Barnsdale through Pontefract to Thwaite Gate near Leeds in the West Riding of the County of York, and to continue the Term thereby granted.}}

| {{|Fleetwood, Preston and West Riding Junction Railway Act 1856|local|44|31-01-1856|note3=|repealed=n|maintained=y|archived=n|}}

| {{|Vale of Clwyd Railway Act 1856|local|45|31-01-1856|note3=|repealed=n|maintained=y|archived=n|}}

| {{|Antrim and Coleraine Turnpikes Abolition Act 1856|local|46|31-01-1856|note3=|repealed=n|maintained=y|archived=n|}}

| {{|Shrewsbury and Hereford Railway Act 1856|local|47|31-01-1856|note3=|repealed=n|maintained=y|archived=n|}}

| {{|Cork Bridge, Waterworks and Improvement Act 1856|local|48|31-01-1856|note3=|repealed=n|maintained=y|archived=n|}}

| {{|Knaresborough and Green Hammerton Turnpike Road Act 1856|local|49|31-01-1856|note3=|repealed=y|maintained=y|archived=n|}}

| {{|Knaresborough and Pateley Bridge Turnpike Road Act 1856|local|50|31-01-1856|note3=|repealed=y|maintained=y|archived=n|}}

| {{|Eastern Counties Railway Act 1856|local|51|31-01-1856|note3=|repealed=y|maintained=y|archived=n| |note4= }}

| {{|Hampstead Junction Railway (Extension of Time) Act 1856|local|52|31-01-1856|note3=|repealed=n|maintained=y|archived=n|}}

| {{|Lowestoft and Beccles Railway Act 1856|local|53|31-01-1856|note3=|repealed=n|maintained=y|archived=n|}}

| {{|Midland Railway Act 1856|local|54|31-01-1856|note3=|repealed=n|maintained=y|archived=n|}}

| {{|Rotherham and Barnby Moor Road (Yorkshire, Nottinghamshire) Act 1856|local|55|31-01-1856|note3=|repealed=y|maintained=y|archived=n|}}

| {{|Glasgow Paving Act 1856|local|56|31-01-1856|note3=|repealed=y|maintained=y|archived=n| |note4= }}

| {{|Wolverhampon Waterworks Transfer Act 1856|local|57|31-01-1856|note3=|repealed=n|maintained=y|archived=n|}}

| {{|Blackburn and Addingham Turnpike Road Act 1856|local|58|31-01-1856|note3=|repealed=y|maintained=y|archived=n| |note4= }}

| {{|West Ham Gas Company Act 1856|local|59|31-01-1856|note3=|repealed=n|maintained=y|archived=n|}}

| {{|Honiton and Sidmouth Turnpike Road Act 1856|local|60|31-01-1856|note3=|repealed=y|maintained=y|archived=n|}}

| {{|Colne Valley and Halstead Railway Act 1856|local|61|31-01-1856|note3=|repealed=n|maintained=y|archived=n|}}

| {{|Wandsworth and Putney Gas Act 1856|local|62|31-01-1856|note3=|repealed=n|maintained=y|archived=n|}}

| {{|North British Railway (Finance and Bridge) Act 1856|local|63|31-01-1856|note3=|repealed=y|maintained=y|archived=n| |note4= }}

| {{|Penrith and Cockermouth Roads Act 1856|local|64|31-01-1856|note3=|repealed=y|maintained=y|archived=n|}}

| {{|Deeping Fen Drainage Act 1856|local|65|31-01-1856|note3=|repealed=n|maintained=y|archived=n|}}

| {{|Stockport and Warrington Road Act 1856|local|66|31-01-1856|note3=|repealed=y|maintained=y|archived=n|}}

| {{|Elgin and Lossiemouth Harbour Act 1856|local|67|31-01-1856|note3=|repealed=n|maintained=y|archived=n|}}

| {{|Carmarthen and Cardigan Railway (Deviation) Act 1856|local|68|31-01-1856|note3=|repealed=n|maintained=y|archived=n|}}

| {{|Luton, Dunstable and Welwyn Junction Railway Act 1856|local|69|31-01-1856|note3=|repealed=n|maintained=y|archived=n|}}

| {{|Scottish Drainage and Improvement Company's Act 1856|local|70|31-01-1856|note3=|repealed=n|maintained=y|archived=n|}}

| {{|Lymington Railway Act 1856|local|71|31-01-1856|note3=|repealed=n|maintained=y|archived=n|}}

| {{|Brough and Eamont Bridge Turnpike (Road) Act 1856|local|72|31-01-1856|note3=|repealed=y|maintained=y|archived=n|}}

| {{|Donington (Lincolnshire) Turnpike Roads Act 1856|local|73|31-01-1856|note3=|repealed=y|maintained=y|archived=n| |note4= }}

| {{|Clay Cross Waterworks Act 1856|local|74|31-01-1856|note3=|repealed=n|maintained=y|archived=n|}}

| {{|Sittingbourne and Sheerness Railway Act 1856|local|75|31-01-1856|note3=|repealed=n|maintained=y|archived=n|}}

| {{|London, Tilbury and Southend Railway (Extension and Branches) Act 1856|local|76|31-01-1856|note3=|repealed=n|maintained=y|archived=n|}}

| {{|Middlesbrough Improvement Act 1856|local|77|31-01-1856|note3=|repealed=y|maintained=y|archived=n|}}

| {{|Torquay Waterworks Act 1856|local|78|31-01-1856|note3=|repealed=n|maintained=y|archived=n|}}

| {{|Yarmouth and Haddiscoe Railway Act 1856|local|79|31-01-1856|note3=|repealed=n|maintained=y|archived=n|}}

| {{|Leeds Waterworks (Wharfe Supply) Act 1856|local|80|31-01-1856|note3=|repealed=y|maintained=y|archived=n| |note4= }}

| {{|Eastern Union Railway Act 1856|local|81|31-01-1856|note3=|repealed=y|maintained=y|archived=n| |note4= }}

| {{|Bawtry and Tinsley Road (Yorkshire, West Riding) Act 1856|local|82|31-01-1856|note3=|repealed=y|maintained=y|archived=n|}}

| {{|Godley Lane and Northowram Road (Yorkshire, West Riding) Act 1856|local|83|31-01-1856|note3=|repealed=y|maintained=y|archived=n|}}

| {{|Halifax and Huddersfield Turnpike Road Act 1856|local|84|31-01-1856|note3=|repealed=y|maintained=y|archived=n| |note4= }}

| {{|Renfrewshire Turnpike Roads Act 1856|local|85|31-01-1856|note3=|repealed=y|maintained=y|archived=n|}}

| {{|Morayshire Railway (Extension) Act 1856|local|86|31-01-1856|note3=|repealed=n|maintained=y|archived=n|}}

| {{|West London and Crytal Palace Railway Act 1856|local|87|31-01-1856|note3=|repealed=n|maintained=y|archived=n|}}

| {{|Bagenalstown and Wexford Railway Act 1856|local|88|31-01-1856|note3=|repealed=n|maintained=y|archived=n|}}

| {{|Monmouth Roads Act 1856|local|89|31-01-1856|note3=|repealed=y|maintained=y|archived=n|}}

| {{|Bournemouth Improvement Act 1856|local|90|31-01-1856|note3=|repealed=y|maintained=y|archived=n|}}

| {{|Edinburgh Water Company's Act 1856|local|91|31-01-1856|note3=|repealed=y|maintained=y|archived=n|}}

| {{|Epsom and Leatherhead Railway Act 1856|local|92|31-01-1856|note3=|repealed=n|maintained=y|archived=n|}}

| {{|Salisbury Railway and Market House Act 1856|local|93|31-01-1856|note3=|repealed=y|archived=n|}}

| {{|Stockton and Darlington and Newcastle and Carlisle Union Railway Act 1856|local|94|31-01-1856|note3=|repealed=n|maintained=y|archived=n|}}

| {{|Swansea Vale Railway Extension Act 1856|local|95|31-01-1856|note3=|repealed=n|maintained=y|archived=n|}}

| {{|Lewes, Eastbourne and Hailsham Turnpike Road Act 1856|local|96|31-01-1856|note3=|repealed=y|maintained=y|archived=n|}}

| {{|Conway and Llandudno Turnpike Road Act 1856|local|97|31-01-1856|note3=|repealed=y|maintained=y|archived=n|}}

| {{|West of Fife Mineral Railway Act 1856|local|98|31-01-1856|note3=|repealed=n|maintained=y|archived=n|}}

| {{|Maybole and Girvan Railway Act 1856|local|99|31-01-1856|note3=|repealed=n|maintained=y|archived=n|}}

| {{|Forest of Dean Central Railway Act 1856|local|100|31-01-1856|note3=|repealed=n|maintained=y|archived=n|}}

| {{|Ceylon Railway Company's Act 1856|local|101|31-01-1856|note3=|repealed=n|maintained=y|archived=n|}}

| {{|Somerset Central Railway (Glastonbury to Bruton) Act 1856|local|102|31-01-1856|note3=|repealed=n|maintained=y|archived=n|}}

| {{|Wem and Bronygarth Roads Act 1856|local|103|31-01-1856|note3=|repealed=y|maintained=y|archived=n| |note4= }}

| {{|Cleobury District Roads Act 1856|local|104|31-01-1856|note3=|repealed=y|maintained=y|archived=n|}}

| {{|Wimbledon and Croydon Railway Act 1856|local|105|31-01-1856|note3=|repealed=n|maintained=y|archived=n|}}

| {{|Stirling and Dunfermline Railway Act 1856|local|106|31-01-1856|note3=|repealed=n|maintained=y|archived=n|}}

| {{|London Printing and Publishing Company's Act 1856|local|107|31-01-1856|note3=|repealed=n|archived=n|}}

| {{|Luton District Road Act 1856|local|108|31-01-1856|note3=|repealed=y|maintained=y|archived=n|}}

| {{|Metropolitan Railway (Great Northern Branch and Amendment) Act 1856|local|109|31-01-1856|note3=|repealed=n|maintained=y|archived=n|}}

| {{|Inverness and Aberdeen Junction Railway Act 1856|local|110|31-01-1856|note3=|repealed=y|maintained=y|archived=n| |note4= }}

| {{|Severn Valley Railway Act 1856|local|111|31-01-1856|note3=|repealed=n|maintained=y|archived=n|}}

| {{|Isle of Wight Ferry Act 1856|local|112|31-01-1856|note3=|repealed=y|maintained=y|archived=n|}}

| {{|Dunblane, Doune and Callander Railway Act 1856|local|113|31-01-1856|note3=|repealed=n|maintained=y|archived=n|}}

| {{|Castle Douglas and Dumfries Railway Act 1856|local|114|31-01-1856|note3=|repealed=n|maintained=y|archived=n|}}

| {{|Leeds Improvement Amendment Act 1856|local|115|31-01-1856|note3=|repealed=n|maintained=y|archived=n|}}

| {{|Grand Junction Waterworks Act 1856|local|116|31-01-1856|note3=|repealed=n|maintained=y|archived=n|}}

| {{|Crystal Palace Company's Act 1856|local|117|31-01-1856|note3=|repealed=y|maintained=y|archived=n| |note4= }}

| {{|Gloucester Gaslight Company's Act 1856|local|118|31-01-1856|note3=|repealed=n|maintained=y|archived=n|}}

| {{|Thames Haven Dock Company's Act 1856|local|119|31-01-1856|note3=|repealed=n|maintained=y|archived=n|}}

| {{|London and South Western Railway (Exeter Extension) Act 1856|local|120|31-01-1856|note3=|repealed=n|maintained=y|archived=n|}}

| {{|East Indian Railway Company Act 1856|local|121|31-01-1856|note3=|repealed=n|maintained=y|archived=n|}}

| {{|Ely Tidal Harbour and Railway (Glamorgan) Act 1856|local|122|31-01-1856|note3=|repealed=n|maintained=y|archived=n|}}

| {{|London and North Western Railway (Shrewsbury Station) Act 1856|local|123|31-01-1856|note3=|repealed=n|maintained=y|archived=n|}}

| {{|Londonderry and Enniskillen Railway Act 1856|local|124|31-01-1856|note3=|repealed=n|maintained=y|archived=n|}}

| {{|Mid Kent Railway (Bromley to St. Mary Cray) Act 1856|local|125|31-01-1856|note3=|repealed=n|maintained=y|archived=n|}}

| {{|Oxford, Worcester and Wolverhampton Railway (Capital) Act 1856|local|126|31-01-1856|note3=|repealed=n|maintained=y|archived=n|}}

| {{|Uttoxeter and Blyth Marsh Turnpike Road. Act 1856|local|127|31-01-1856|note3=|repealed=y|maintained=y|archived=n|}}

| {{|Bardney, &c. Drainage Act 1856|local|128|21-07-1856|repealed=n|maintained=y|archived=n|An Act to amend An Act for draining, embarking, and improving the Fen Lands and Low Grounds within the Parishes, Hamlets, Townships, or Places of Bardney, Southrow otherwise Southry, Tupholme, Bucknall, Horsington, Stixwould, Edlington, and Thimbleby, in the County of Lincoln, and to confer further Powers on the Commissioners under such Act, and for other purposes.}}

| {{|Waveney Valley Railway Amendment Act 1856|local|129|31-01-1856|note3=|repealed=y|maintained=y|archived=n| |note4= }}

| {{|West End of London and Clapham and Norwood Junction Railway Act 1856|local|130|31-01-1856|note3=|repealed=n|maintained=y|archived=n|}}

| {{|Severn Navigation Act 1856|note1=|local|131|29-07-1856|repealed=n|maintained=y|archived=n|An Act to render more effectual the Powers of raising Money given by "The Severn Navigation Act, 1853," and for other Purposes.}}

| {{|Shrewsbury and Welshpool Railway Act 1856|local|132|31-01-1856|note3=|repealed=n|maintained=y|archived=n|}}

| {{|Imprisoned Debtors Discharge Society's Act 1856|local|133|31-01-1856|note3=|repealed=n|maintained=y|archived=n|}}

| {{|Scottish North Eastern Railway Act 1856|local|134|31-01-1856|note3=|repealed=n|maintained=y|archived=n|}}

| {{|Dorset Central Railway Act 1856|local|135|31-01-1856|note3=|repealed=n|maintained=y|archived=n|}}

| {{|Perth, Almond Valley and Methven Railway Act 1856|local|136|31-01-1856|note3=|repealed=n|maintained=y|archived=n|}}

| {{|Oxford, Worcester and Wolverhampton Railway (Extension of Time) Act 1856|note1=|local|137|29-07-1856|repealed=n|maintained=y|archived=n|An Act to extend the Time limited for completing the Oxford, Worcester, and Wolverhampton Railway, and for adapting the same to the Broad Gauge, and for other Purposes.}}

| {{|Perth Burgh and Harbour (No.2) Act 1856|local|138|29-07-1856|repealed=n|maintained=y|archived=n|An Act to provide for the Arrangement of the financial Affairs of the City of Perth; for the Maintenance of the Port and Harbour; and for other Purposes therewith connected.}}

| {{|Scottish Central Railway (Denny Branches) Act 1856|note1=|local|139|29-07-1856|repealed=y|maintained=y|archived=n|An Act to enable the Scottish Central Railway Company to make Branch Railways to the Town of Denny in the County of Stirling.}}
}}

1857

20 Vict.
 Annual Inclosure Act 1857 c 5. Sometimes called the Inclosures Pursuant to Report of Inclosure Commissioners Act 1857.
 Annuity to Right Honourable Charles Shaw Lefevre Act 1857 c 9
 Appropriation Act 1857 c 20
 Commissioners of Supply (Scotland) Act 1857 c 11
 Copyhold, etc., Commission Act 1857 c 8
 County Police Act 1857 c 2
 Customs Duties Amendment Act 1857 c 15. Sometimes called the Customs Act 1857.
 Duty on Racehorses Act 1857 c 16
 Ecclesiastical Jurisdiction Act 1857 c 10
 Exchequer Bills Act 1857 c 17
 Extra-Parochial Places Act 1857 c 19
 Grant of Military, etc., Commissions Act 1857 c 4
 Income Tax Act 1857 c 6
 Indemnity Act 1857 c 7
 Lighting of Towns (Ireland) Act 1857 c 12
 Marine Mutiny Act 1857 c 14
 Mutiny Act 1857 c 13
 Poor Act 1857 c 18
 Public Health Supplemental Act 1857 c 3
 Royal Marines Act 1857 c 1

20 & 21 Vict.
 Annual Turnpike Acts Continuance Act 1857 c 24. Sometimes called the Turnpike Acts Continuance Act 1857.
 Annuity, Princess Royal Act 1857 c 2
 Appropriation Act 1857 c 69
 Bankruptcy and Real Securities (Scotland) Act 1857 c 19
 Bill Chamber Procedure Act 1857 c 18
 Borough of Hanley Act 1857 c 10
 Boundaries of Burghs Extension (Scotland) Act 1857 c 70
 Boundary Survey (Ireland) Act 1857 c 45
 Burial Act 1857 c 81
 Burial Grounds (Scotland) Act 1857 c 42
 Caledonian Canal Act 1857 c 27
 Chatham Lands Purchase Act 1857 c 30
 Cinque Ports Act 1857 c 1
 City of London Burial Act 1857 c 35
 Civil Service Superannuation Act 1857 c 37
 Colonial Attorneys Relief Act 1857 or the Colonial Attorneys Relief Act c 39. Also called the Colonial Attorneys Relief Act 1857.
 Confirmation of Marriages Act 1857 c 29
 Constabulary (Ireland) Act 1857 c 17
 County Courts Act 1857 c 36
 Court of Exchequer Chamber (Ireland) Act 1857 c 6
 Court of Probate Act 1857 c 77
 Court of Session Act 1857 c 56
 Crown Suits (Scotland) Act 1857 c 44
 Customs Amendment Act 1857 c 62.
 Customs and Excise Duties Act 1857 c 61. Sometimes called the Customs and Excise Act 1857.
 Dublin Revising Barristers Act 1857 c 68
 Dulwich College Act 1857 c 84
 Dunbar Harbour Loan Act 1857 c 63
 Episcopal and Capitular Estates Act 1857 c 74
 General Board of Health Act 1857 c 38
 Glebe Lands Leasing Powers (Ireland) Act 1857 c 47
 Grand Jury Cess (Ireland) Act 1857 c 7
 Grand Jury (Ireland) Act 1857 c 15
 Illicit Distillation (Ireland) Act 1857 c 40
 Inclosure Act 1857 c. 31
 Income Tax Act 1857 c 5
 Industrial Schools Act 1857 c 48
 Irish Bankrupt and Insolvent Act 1857 c 60 Sometimes called the Bankrupt and Insolvent Act 1857.
 Joint Stock Banking Companies Act 1857 c 49
 Joint Stock Companies Act 1857 c 14
 Joint Stock Companies Act Amendment Act 1857 c 80. Also called the Joint Stock Companies Act 1856: Amendment Act 1857
 Joint Stock Companies Winding-up Amendment Act 1857 c 78
 Jurisdiction in Siam Act 1857 c 75
 Land and Assessed Taxes (Scotland) Act 1857 c 28
 Land Tax Commissioners (Appointment) Act 1857 c 46
 Lands Valuation (Scotland) Act 1857 c 58
 Loan Societies Act 1857 c 41
 Lunacy (Scotland) Act 1857 c 71
 Married Women's Reversionary Interests Act 1857 c 57
 Matrimonial Causes Act 1857 c 85
 Metropolitan Police Act 1857 c 64
 Militia Ballots Suspension Act 1857 c 21
 Militia Embodiment Act 1857 c 82
 Militia (Ireland) Act 1857 c 11
 Militia Pay Act 1857 c 65
 Ministers Money (Ireland) Act 1857 c 8
 Municipal Corporations Act 1857 c 50
 Mutiny, etc., East Indies Act 1857 c 66
 New Brunswick Boundary Act 1857 c 34
 New Zealand Company's Claims Act 1857 c 52
 New Zealand Constitution (Amendment) Act 1857 c 53
 New Zealand Loan Guarantee Act 1857 c 51
 Obscene Publications Act 1857 c 83
 Oxford University Act 1857 c. 25
 Parochial Schoolmasters (Scotland) Act 1857 c 59
 Penal Servitude Act 1857 c 3
 Pimlico Improvement Act 1857 c 67
 Police (Scotland) Act 1857 c 72
 Portland Harbour Waterworks Act 1857 c 32
 Probates and Letters of Administration Act (Ireland) 1857 c 79. Also called the Probates and Letters of Administration (Ireland) Act 1857.
 Provisional Order Confirmation (Turnpikes) Act 1857 c 9
 Public Health Supplemental Act for Aldershot 1857 c 22
 Public Works (Ireland) Act 1857 c 23
 Punishment of Frauds Act 1857 c 54
 Reformatory Schools (England) Act 1857 c 55
 Registration of Leases (Scotland) Act 1857 c 26
 Representative Peers (Ireland) Act 1857 c 33
 Roman Catholic Charities Act 1857 c 76
 Second Annual Inclosure Act 1857 c 20. Sometimes called the Inclosures Act 1857.
 Smoke Nuisance (Scotland) Act 1857 c 73
 Sound Dues Redemption Act 1857 c 12
 Summary Jurisdiction Act 1857 c 43
 Supply Act 1857 c 4
 Turnpikes Abolition Act (Ireland) 1857 c 16. Sometimes called the Turnpikes Abolition (Ireland) Act 1857.
 Workhouse Sites Act 1857 c 13

21 & 22 Vict.

}}

1858

21 & 22 Vict.
 Annual Inclosure Act 1858 c 8. Sometimes called the Inclosures Act 1858.
 Annual Turnpike Acts Continuance Act 1858 c 63. Sometimes called the Turnpike Acts Continuance Act 1858.
 Annuity (Lady of Havelock) Act 1858 c 2
 Appropriation Act 1858 c 107
 Army Enlistment Act 1858 c 55
 Births and Deaths Registration Act 1858 c 25
 Bishops Trusts Substitution Act 1858 c 71
 Bristol Charities Act 1858 c 30
 Bristol Charities Act 1858 c 31
 British Columbia Government Act 1858 c 99
 Cambridge University Act 1858 c 11
 Chairman of Quarter Sessions (Ireland) Act 1858 c 88
 Chancery Amendment Act 1858 c 27
 Cheap Trains and Canal Carriers Act 1858 c 75
 Chelsea Bridge Act 1858 c 66
 Chelsea Hospital Act 1858 c 18
 Chelsea Hospital Purchase Act 1858 c 21
 Church of Ireland Act 1858 c 59
 Confirmation of Certain Marriages Act 1858 c 46
 Confirmation of Executors (Scotland) Act 1858 c 56
 Contagious Diseases of Sheep Act 1858 c 62
 Copyhold Commission Act 1858 c 53
 Copyhold Act 1858 c 94. Sometimes called the Copyholds Act 1858.
 Copyright of Designs Act 1858 c 70
 Cornwall Submarine Mines Act 1858 c 109
 Corrupt Practices Act 1858 c 87
 County Courts Act 1858 c 74. Sometimes called the County Court Districts (England) Act 1858.
 County Property Act 1858 c 92
 County Rates (England) Act 1858 c 33
 Court of Probate Act 1858 c 95
 Cowley's Charity Act 1858 c 81
 Customs Act 1858 c 16
 Customs Duties Act 1858 c 12.
 Detached Parts of Counties (England) Act 1858 c 68
 Drafts on Bankers Act 1858 c 79
 Durham County Palatine Act 1858 c 45
 East India Loans Act 1858 c 3
 Ecclesiastical Jurisdiction Act 1858 c 50
 Ecclesiastical Leasing Act 1858 c 57
 Election of Members during Recess Act 1858 c 110
 Exchequer Bills Act 1858 c 13
 Exchequer Bonds Act 1858 c 14
 Excise Act 1858 c 15
 Four Courts (Dublin) Extension Act 1858 c 84. Sometimes called the Dublin, Four Courts Act 1858 or the Four Courts Extension Act 1858.
 Franchise Prisons Abolition Act 1858 c 22
 Friendly Societies Act 1858 c 101
 Government of India Act 1858 c 106
 Hainault Forest (Allotment of Commons) Act 1858 c 37
 Harvey's Charity, Folkestone Act 1858 c 29
 Herring Fisheries (Scotland) Act 1858 c 69
 Indemnity Act 1858 c 54
 Inferior Courts Officers (Ireland) Act 1858 c 52
 Jews Relief Act 1858 c 49
 Joint Stock Banks Act 1858 c 91
 Joint Stock Companies Amendment Act 1858 c 60. Sometimes called the Joint Stock Companies Act 1858.
 Judgment Mortgage (Ireland) Act 1858 c 105
 Landed Estates Court (Ireland) Act 1858 c 72
 Lands of the Commissioners for the Exhibition of 1851 Act 1858 c 36
 Law of False Pretences Act 1858 c 47
 Legitimacy Declaration Act 1858 c 93
 Loan Societies Act 1858 c 19
 Local Government Act 1858 c 98
 Lunatics (Scotland) Act 1858 c 89
 Marine Mutiny Act 1858 c 7
 Matrimonial Causes Act 1858 c 108
 The Medical Act c 90
 Metropolis Management Amendment Act 1858 c 104
 Militia Act 1858 c 4
 Militia Act 1858 c 85
 Militia Ballot Suspension Act 1858 c 39
 Militia Embodiment Act 1858 c 86
 Militia Pay Act 1858 c 82
 Municipal Franchise Act 1858 c 43
 Mutiny Act 1858 c 9
 Navigations (Ireland) Act 1858 c 41
 New General Post Office, Edinburgh, Act 1858 c 40
 Oaths of Allegiance, etc., and Relief of Jews Act 1858 c 48
 Parliamentary Witnesses Act 1858 c 78
 Peace Preservation (Ireland) Act 1858 c 28
 Petty Sessions Clerk (Ireland) Act 1858 c 100
 Police (Scotland) Act 1858 c 65
 Portendic and Albreda Convention Act 1858 c 35
 Portumna Bridge Tolls Act 1858 c 23
 Prescription (Ireland) Act 1858 c 42
 Property Qualification for Members of Parliament Act 1858 c 26
 Provisional Order Confirmation Turnpikes Act 1858 c 80
 Public Health Act 1858 c 97
 Public Health Supplemental Act 1858 c 10
 Railways (Ireland) Act 1858 c 34
 Reduction of National Debt Act 1858 c 38
 Reformatory Schools (Ireland) Act 1858 c 103
 Returns to Secretary of State Act 1858 c 67
 Roman Catholic Charities Act 1858 c 51
 Second Annual Inclosure Act 1858 c 61. Sometimes called the Inclosures Act 1858.
 Settled Estates Act 1858 c 77
 Stamps Act 1858 c 20
 Stamps Act 1858 c 24
 Stanhope and Wolsingham Rectories Act 1858 c 58
 Stipendiary Magistrates Act 1858 c 73
 Supply Act 1858 c 5
 Supply Act 1858 c 6
 Supply Act 1858 c 17
 Titles to Land (Scotland) Act 1858 c 76
 Universities and College Estates Act 1858 c 44
 Universities (Scotland) Act 1858 c 83
 Vaccination (Ireland) Act 1858 c 64
 Validation of Acts of Late Chief Justice of Bombay Act 1858 c 32
 West Indian Incumbered Estates Act 1858 c 96
 Works of Utility, etc., Indemnity Act 1858 c 102

1859

22 Vict.
 Affirmations by Quakers, etc. Act 1859 c 10
 Annual Inclosure Act 1859 c 3. Sometimes called the Inclosure Act or the Inclosures Act.
 Appropriation Act 1859 c 23
 Burial Act 1859 c 1
 Combination of Workmen Act 1859 c 34
 Commissioners for Oaths, Bail in Error, etc. Act 1859 c 16
 Confirmation and Probate Amendment Act 1859 c 30
 Confirmation of Marriages Act 1859 c 24
 Convict Prisons Abroad Act 1859 c 25
 Coroners' Inquests, Bail Act 1859 c 33
 County Courts Westminster and Southwark Act 1859 c 8
 Defence Act 1859 c 12
 East India Loan Act 1859 c 11
 Evidence by Commission Act 1859 c 20
 Exchange of Ecclesiastical Patronage Act 1859 c 9
 Exchequer Bills Act 1859 c 22
 Indemnity Act 1859 c 15
 Local Government Supplemental Act 1859 c 31
 Manor Courts Abolition (Ireland) Act 1859 c 14. (Title: An Act for the Abolition of Manor Courts and the better Recovery of Small Debts in Ireland). This Act transferred disputes which were previously be dealt with by a manor court to the petty sessions courts.
 Marine Mutiny Act 1859 c 5
 Medical Act 1859 c 21
 Municipal Corporation Act 1859 c 35
 Mutiny Act 1859 c 4
 Naval Medical Supplemental Fund Society Act 1859 c 28
 Nottingham Charities Act 1859 c 18
 Observance of November 5, May 29, etc. Act 1859 c 2
 Patents for Inventions Act 1859 c 13
 Poor Law Charges Act 1859 c 29
 Public Offices Extension Act 1859 c 19
 Recreation Grounds Act 1859 c 27
 Remission of Penalties Act 1859 c 32
 Savings Banks (Ireland) Act 1859 c 17
 Superannuation Act 1859 c 26
 Supply Act 1859 c 6
 Supply Act 1859 c 7

22 & 23 Vict.

See also
 List of Acts of the Parliament of the United Kingdom

External links
- Volume 80 - 3 & 4 Victoria - 1840 - different edition
- 4 & 5 Victoria - 1841 - different edition
- 5 & 6 Victoria - 1842 - different edition
- 6 & 7 Victoria - 1843 - different edition
- 7 & 8 Victoria - 1844 - different edition
- 8 & 9 Victoria - 1845
- 9 & 10 Victoria - 1846
- 10 & 11 Victoria - 1847
- 11 & 12 Victoria - 1847-8
- Volume 89 - 12 & 13 Victoria - 1849 - different edition
- 13 & 14 Victoria - 1850 - different edition - also
- Volume 91 - 14 & 15 Victoria - 1851
- 15 & 16 Victoria - 1852 - different edition
- 16 & 17 Victoria - 1853
- 17 & 18 Victoria - 1854
- 18 & 19 Victoria - 1854-55 - also- different edition 
- 19 & 20 Victoria - 1856
 - 20 Victoria - 1857 - different edition
- 21 & 22 Victoria - 1857-8
- 22 Victoria - 1859
- 22 & 23 Victoria - 1859

References

{{|Chard Canal Company Act 1840|local|1|23-03-1840|maintained=n|archived=n|An Act to enable the Chard Canal Company to raise further Monies; and to amend the Act relating to the same Canal.}}

1840
1840s in the United Kingdom
1850s in the United Kingdom